= Gundamma Katha =

1962 film directed by Kamalakara Kameswara Rao

- Theatrical release poster
- Directed by: Kamalakara Kameswara Rao
- Story by: Chakrapani
- Dialogue by: D. V. Narasaraju
- Based on: The Taming of the Shrew by William Shakespeare Mane Thumbida Hennu (1958) by B. Vittalacharya
- Produced by: Nagi Reddi; Chakrapani
- Starring: N. T. Rama Rao; Akkineni Nageswara Rao; Savitri; Jamuna; Suryakantham; S.V. Ranga Rao
- Cinematography: Marcus Bartley
- Edited by: G. Kalyana Sundaram; D. G. Jayaram
- Music by: Ghantasala
- Production company: Vijaya Productions
- Release date: 7 June 1962
- Running time: 166 minutes
- Country: India
- Language: Telugu

Gundamma Katha (transl. Gundamma's story) is a 1962 Indian Telugu-language comedy drama film directed by Kamalakara Kameswara Rao and co-produced by Nagi Reddi and Chakrapani under their banner Vijaya Productions. It stars N. T. Rama Rao, Akkineni Nageswara Rao, Savitri, and Jamuna, with S. V. Ranga Rao, Suryakantham, and Ramana Reddy in supporting roles.

Partially inspired by William Shakespeare's comedy The Taming of the Shrew, Gundamma Katha is an official remake of the Kannada film Mane Thumbida Hennu (1958). It is also the first remake by Vijaya Productions. Gundamma Katha is the story of Gundamma, a rich widow who ill-treats her selfless step-daughter Lakshmi, who is reduced to working as a maid. Lakshmi dotes on Gundamma's daughter Saroja, an arrogant woman who nevertheless deeply cares for Lakshmi. The film's centrepiece is formed by the way Lakshmi's suitor Anjaneya "Anji" Prasad and Saroja's lover Raja bring a change to Gundamma's life after both couples' marriages.

The film is Rama Rao's 100th appearance and Nageswara Rao's 99th. It was photographed by Marcus Bartley, and co-edited by G. Kalyana Sundaram and D. G. Jayaram. Ghantasala composed the film's soundtrack and score. Madhavapeddi Gokhale and Kaladhar were the film's art directors. The production phase lasted for a year; it was filmed in and around Madras, mainly on sets at Vijaya Vauhini Studios.

Released on 7 June 1962, Gundamma Katha received praise for its story, screenplay and cast performances, and criticism for its poor character development. The film was commercially successful, completing a 100-day run in 17 centres and a silver-jubilee run at the Durga Kalamandir, Vijayawada. It is regarded as the last film of Vijaya Productions' "Golden Age". The film was simultaneously shot in Tamil as Manithan Maravillai, also produced by Vijaya Productions, had Nageswara Rao, Savitri, and Jamuna reprising their roles. Though Gundamma Katha has achieved cult status in Telugu cinema, it has received criticism for its influence on stereotypes in the narration of other unrelated Telugu films.

== Plot ==
Gundamma is a rich widow who ill-treats her stepdaughter, Lakshmi, a selfless person, who is reduced to working as a maid. Gundamma has a daughter, Saroja, and a son, Prabhakar. Gundamma has a half-brother, Ghantayya, a cunning but weak milk vendor. Ghantayya wants Gundamma to marry off Saroja to his criminal son Bhoopati, who is in prison. To achieve this goal without the knowledge of Gundamma, he spoils every marriage proposal Saroja receives. Saroja's arrogance and Lakshmi's courteous attitude indirectly help Ghantayya. Gundamma decides to marry off Lakshmi to a vagabond and Saroja to the son of Ramabhadrayya, a wealthy man living in the faraway town of Veerapuram.

Ramabhadrayya knows about Saroja (Gundamma's daughter) through a marriage broker and goes to Gundamma's home after finding that her late husband was a friend of his, who had aided him in convincing his in-laws to let him marry their daughter. After observing the situation in Gundamma's house with the help of Ghantayya, Ramabhadrayya sends his elder son, Anjaneya "Anji" Prasad, to Gundamma's house as a servant to get him married to Lakshmi, whom he finds innocent and docile. He sends his younger son, Raja, to marry Saroja. Raja then meets Saroja through his cousin Padma, Saroja’s friend and Prabhakar’s classmate and lover. Anji and Lakshmi get married, and Raja and Saroja fall in love. Ramabhadrayya writes a letter to Gundamma opposing the marriage of Raja and Saroja upon the former's instructions, and Anji conducts their marriage against Ghantayya's wishes. Shortly afterward, Prabhakar and Padma's marriage is conducted.

Raja acts like a drunkard and masquerades as Ramabhadrayya's son, seeking to gain Saroja's wealth. A rift develops between Anji and Gundamma, and he leaves with Lakshmi. Anji, Raja, and Ramabhadrayya reveal the truth to Lakshmi later. Raja storms out of Gundamma's house, and Saroja follows him; they join Ramabhadrayya's house as gardeners, and Raja ensures Saroja is unaware of their employer. In the process, Saroja's character transforms from one of arrogance to one of a hardworking, courteous person.

Gundamma is tortured by Padma's ruthless, confidence-trickster aunt Durga. Bhoopati is released from prison, and Ghantayya asks Gundamma to give him some money. Because of Gundamma's arrogance, Prabhakar and Padma leave for Bangalore. Durga steals the money in the locker, accuses Gundamma of robbery, and locks her in a room behind the house. Lakshmi and Anji visit Gundamma and become aware of her condition. Lakshmi and Gundamma coerce Durga and retrieve the money she stole. Bhoopati comes to Durga's rescue but is defeated by Anji in a duel and is hospitalised.

Saroja meets Ramabhadrayya, her employer, and walks out after a heated argument. She meets Lakshmi on the way and learns about Raja's plans and that Ramabhadrayya is her father-in-law. The film ends with Gundamma staying with her daughters in Ramabhadrayya's house.

== Cast ==
- N. T. Rama Rao as Anjaneya "Anji" Prasad
- Akkineni Nageswara Rao as Raja
- Savitri as Lakshmi
- Jamuna as Saroja
- Suryakantham as Gundamma
- Ramana Reddy as Kanchu Ghantayya
- S. V. Ranga Rao as Ramabhadrayya
- Rajanala as Bhoopati
- Haranath as Prabhakar
- Allu Ramalingaiah as Iyer
- L. Vijayalakshmi as Padma
- Chhaya Devi as Durgamma
- Hemalatha as Kanchu Ghantayya's wife
- Rushyendramani as Padma's mother

== Production ==
=== Development ===
Nagi Reddi of Vijaya Productions helped B. Vittalacharya in the production of Mane Thumbida Hennu (1958), the latter's directorial debut in Kannada cinema. As an act of gratitude, Vittalacharya sold the remake rights to Nagi Reddi. Mane Thumbida Hennu revolves around the life of a rich woman whose brother marries off her daughter to a criminal when she chooses a mentally challenged person as her step-daughter's life partner. Nagi Reddi chose to remake the film in Telugu and discussed it with D. V. Narasa Raju; it was the first time Vijaya Productions decided to remake a film. After the script was ready, Nagi Reddi approached C. Pullayya to direct the remake after considering B. N. Reddy. Pullayya was not appreciative of Narasa Raju's treatment of the script and Nagi Reddy met his partner Chakrapani to develop the script further.

Chakrapani decided to retain only the background of Gundamma's family from the original and rewrote the remaining script, taking inspiration from William Shakespeare's comedy, The Taming of the Shrew. Chakrapani killed the character of Gundamma's cowardly husband because he felt that a husband who cannot answer his wife's questions was not eligible for inclusion. Kamalakara Kameswara Rao was chosen to direct the film. Chakrapani named the central character Gundamma in the remake after one of the characters in the original, despite a lack of nativity. Nagi Reddi's family members and the employees of the Vijaya Vauhini Studios used to ask him "Gundamma Katha Entha varaku vachchindi?" (What is the progress in Gundamma's story?), which prompted Nagi Reddi to title the film Gundamma Katha after considering various options. Marcus Bartley was recruited as the director of photography; G. Kalyana Sundaram and D. G. Jayaram edited the film. Ghantasala composed the soundtrack and score. Madhavapeddi Gokhale and Kaladhar were the film's art directors. M. Pithambaram and T. P. Bhaktavatsalam provided the make-up.

=== Casting ===
Suryakantham was chosen to play Gundamma and Chakrapani suggested Kameswara Rao not to make any special efforts to make her character look ruthless because Suryakantham had an aggressive body language. N. T. Rama Rao and Akkineni Nageswara Rao were chosen as the male leads Anjaneya "Anji" Prasad and Raja, making Gundamma Katha their 10th film together; the film was Rama Rao's 100th film as an actor and Nageswara Rao's 99th. Savitri and Jamuna were chosen as the female leads Lakshmi and Saroja, respectively. Saroja was created by Chakrapani for the film, taking cues from The Taming of the Shrew. S. V. Ranga Rao, Ramana Reddy and Rajanala Kaleswara Rao were cast in the supporting roles of Ramabhadrayya, Ghantayya and Bhoopati. Haranath and L. Vijayalakshmi were chosen to play Gundamma's son Prabhakar and daughter-in-law Padma, while Chhaya Devi appeared as Padma's aunt Durgamma.

=== Filming ===
I can understand [Nartanasala] or [Mahamantri Timmarusu] having classical dances, because one was a mythological and the other a historical. But Telugu producers insisted that if I acted in a film, there had to be a dance. In Gundamma Katha, for example, a dance was included in the last minute at the producer’s insistence.

— Vijayalakshmi, in a 2015 interview with The Hindu

The production phase of Gundamma Katha lasted nearly a year, with one of the reasons being that both Rama Rao and Nageswara Rao had delays in giving bulk dates for the project. A house set was erected in Vijaya Vauhini Studios, Madras (now Chennai) where scenes featuring Gundamma and other key characters were filmed. C. Kuppuswami Naidu and K. Srinivasan supervised the erection of sets.

The film's shooting was severely affected by scheduling conflicts; Chakrapani would make telephone calls to all the key artistes, and sequences were filmed based on their availability. The filming of the song "Kolo Koloyanna" was significantly affected by this; all four lead actors were supposed to take part in the song's shoot; the film's editor took care to ensure a smooth flow in the sequences during the post-production phase. The scene before the song that features Anji and Raja communicating with whistles was conceptualised by Narasaraju. Harbans Singh supervised the film's special effects.

Since Vijayalakshmi was a trained dancer, an elaborate dance sequence with no connection to the film's story was introduced as a stage performance and Nageswara Rao, Jamuna, and Haranath were made to sit along with the audience. The song "Prema Yatralaku" was filmed in the gardens near the Vijaya Vauhini Studios after abandoning plans to film it in either Ooty or Brindavan Gardens, Srirangapatna. During the film's shoot, a kickboxing tournament was held in Madras; this inspired Chakrapani and Kameswara Rao to add a fight sequence between Rama Rao and Kaleswara Rao. Pasumarthi Krishnamurthy conducted the choreography for the song sequences. The film was processed at Vijaya Laboratory and was recorded on Western Electric equipment. Its total length was approximately 14,999 feet (4,572 m) in 18 reels, with a running time of 166 minutes.

== Themes ==
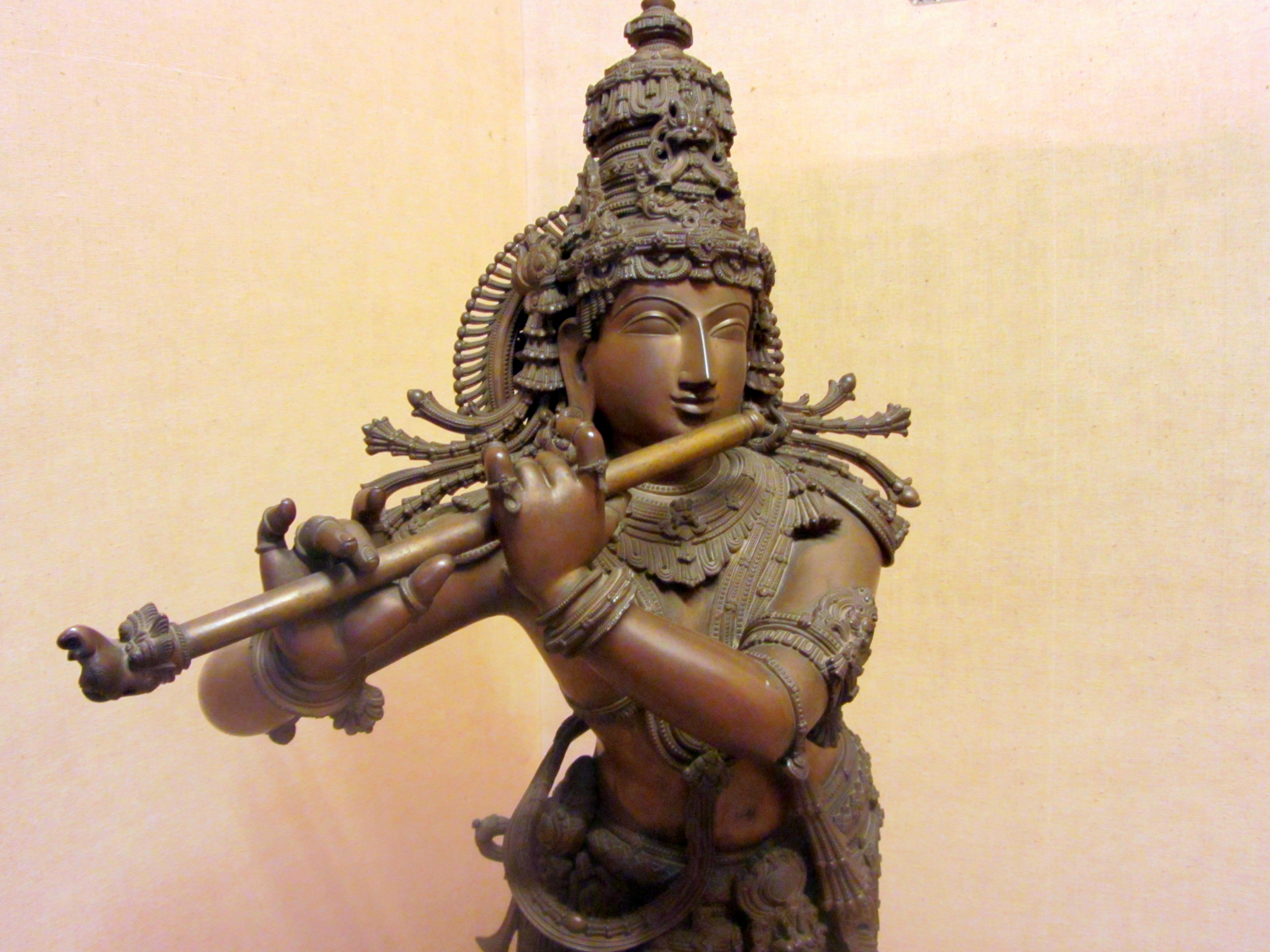
The song "Aligina Velane Choodali" describes the life of Krishna as a child and an adult from a woman's point of view.

Gundamma Katha is based partially on William Shakespeare's play The Taming of the Shrew. It focuses on a widow named Gundamma and her two daughters. The film's main theme is the step-daughter Lakshmi facing problems because of the widow, and the former's suitor teaching the latter a lesson. Using the first conversation between Gundamma and Lakshmi, in which the former abuses the latter for disturbing her sleep, Narasaraju introduces Gundamma's mindset and behaviour. Further incidents include the dismissal of a server fired from a hotel after refusing to work as a servant in Gundamma's house, and Ghantayya explaining Gundamma's character to Ramabhadrayya.

According to Filmfare's V. V. S. R. Hanumantha Rao, true friendship is the theme of the film. Most of the film's dialogue, especially that between Ramana Reddy and Allu Ramalingaiah, are satirical and provide references to Indian society during the 1960s. The song "Lechindi Nidra" is about the empowerment of women and their role in areas of the government. In her article "Manifestation of devotion" about the importance of the Krishna Janmashtami festival, Rajeswari Kalyanam of The Hans India said the lyrics and photography of the song "Aligina Velane Choodali" recall the romantic side of Krishna that every woman sees in her husband or the person she loves. It also recalls the bond Krishna shared with his foster mother Yashoda.

== Music ==
Gundamma Katha

Soundtrack album by Ghantasala
- Genre: Feature film soundtrack
- Length: 22:09
- Language: Telugu
- Label: His Master's Voice

The official soundtrack of Gundamma Katha was composed by Ghantasala; it consists of eight songs whose lyrics were written by Pingali. The sound mixing process was supervised by A. Krishnan and V. Sivaram, and the soundtrack was processed by N. C. Sen Gupta. Ghantasala provided vocals for Rama Rao and Nageswara Rao; P. Susheela and P. Leela provided the vocals for Savitri and Jamuna. The songs "Entha Hayi" and "Mounamuga Nee" were composed in the raga Mohanam. The song "Aligina Velane" is based on Desh raga.

The soundtrack was marketed by His Master's Voice; it was successful and all eight songs were well received. "Lechindi Nidra", "Kolu Koloyanna", "Aligina Velane Choodali", and "Prema Yatralaku" achieved cult status in Telugu cinema, particularly for their lyrics. M. L. Narasimham of The Hindu noted that all songs from the film "are being enjoyed even today by music lovers."

Track list
No.	Title	Artist(s)	Length
1.	"Lechindi Nidra"	Ghantasala	02:26
2.	"Sannaga Veeche"	P. Susheela	03:13
3.	"Aligina Velane Choodali"	P. Susheela	02:58
4.	"Entha Hayi"	Ghantasala, P. Susheela	02:43
5.	"Prema Yatralaku"	Ghantasala, P. Susheela	02:49
6.	"Manishi Maraledu"	Ghantasala, P. Leela	03:03
7.	"Kolo Koloyanna"	Ghantasala, P. Susheela	02:29
8.	"Mounamuga Nee"	Ghantasala	02:28
Total length:			22:09

== Release ==
Gundamma Katha was released on 7 June 1962. In the opening credits, images of the film's cast were used instead of their names; the leads and Ranga Rao's images are screened first, and are followed by those of Suryakantham and the other supporting cast.

Gundamma Katha was a profitable venture for Vijaya Productions; it completed a 100-day run in 17 theatres across Andhra Pradesh, and completed a silver-jubilee run at the Durga Kalamandir, Vijayawada. It became the first film to be run for 100 days with three screenings per day in Hyderabad. The silver-jubilee celebrations were not held, and the planned budget for the event was donated to a fundraiser who was active during the Sino-Indian War.

== Reception ==
Upon release, many critics praised Gundamma Katha for its story, screenplay and performances of the lead cast, while some criticised its poor character development. Krishnanand, writing for Andhra Patrika on 15 June 1962, praised Suryakantham's role in particular and said, "Justifying the film's title, the makers have placed utmost importance on Gundamma's character, and Suryakantham who breathe life into that character, has equally mesmerized the audience with her performance." On the same day, an article from Zamin Ryot opined that the film was filled of humour, "The screenplay, each and every scene, and every character in the story is purposefully made for humour; Humour in anger, humour in brawl – humour everywhere!" it stated. Earlier on 8 June, a critic from Andhra Jyothi praising the film, wrote, "This isn't Gundamma's story, rather the story we see everyday – Our story."

In an essay by V. Chakravarty writing for Eenadu in 2012, it was expressed that the characters played by Jamuna and Suryakantham were poorly written and under-developed. Chakravarty also found the characters played by Haranath and Vijayalakshmi out of place. Similar views were expressed after a special screening at L. V. Prasad's residence but Chakrapani was confident of the film's success when he saw children clapping in response to Rama Rao's performance in comical sequences. Narasimham wrote in his review of the film for The Hindu in 2016, "With more emphasis on banter in the story, the actors, without straining a nerve, sailed smoothly through their characters."

== Other versions and remakes ==
Gundamma Katha was simultaneosly made in Tamil as Manithan Maravillai (1962) by Vijaya Productions. Chakrapani directed the film and Gemini Ganesan replaced Rama Rao, while Nageswara Rao, Savitri and Jamuna reprised their roles. Manithan Maravillai was Nageswara Rao's 100th film as an actor; Gundamma Katha became a notable film for both Rama Rao and Nageswara Rao as they completed 100 films as actors with two versions of the same film. Unlike the original film, Manithan Maravillai was a commercial failure. Vijaya had also planned to remake Gundamma Katha in Hindi, but this plan never came to fruition. However it was remade in Hindi as Swayamvar in 1980.

Rama Rao's son Nandamuri Balakrishna and Nageswara Rao's son Nagarjuna, who established themselves as actors in Telugu cinema, planned to remake Gundamma Katha but withdrew after failing to find a suitable replacement for Suryakantham. In 2012, D. Ramanaidu planned to produce the remake of the film with Rama Rao's grandson N. T. Rama Rao Jr. and Nagarjuna's son Naga Chaitanya playing the leading male characters but the plans were cancelled. In April 2016, Mohan Babu expressed interest in remaking the film with his son Vishnu Manchu and Raj Tarun. He added that G. Nageswara Reddy would direct the remake which he would announce after acquiring the rights.

== Sequel and digitisation plans ==
After Gundamma Katha's release, Chakrapani wrote a story named "Gundamma Gari Kootulla Katha" (The Story of Gundamma's Daughters). It was serialised in Bharathi magazine. Its plot involves Ghantayya creating a rift between Lakshmi and Saroja. Readers expected Chakrapani to produce a sequel to Gundamma Katha but he showed no interest. In 1982, Rama Rao and Krishna acted in a film, Vayyari Bhamalu Vagalamari Bhartalu, whose story resembled "Gundamma Gari Kootulla Katha".

In November 2007, a Hyderabad-based company named Goldstone Technologies acquired the film negative rights to 14 Telugu films produced by Vijaya Vauhini Studios, including Mayabazar (1957) and Gundamma Katha, to release colourised, digitally remastered versions. The remastered and colourised version of Mayabazar, released in January 2010, was commercially successful but Goldstone Technologies decided not to remaster the remaining 13 films, including Gundamma Katha, saying most of the producers who sold the rights to the negatives to television channels lost control over them. Goldstone further explained that a number of legal issues over ownership and copyright issues arise whenever producers try to do something on their own.

== Legacy ==
Gundamma Katha is regarded as the last film of Vijaya Productions' "Golden Age". In commemoration of the Centenary of Indian Cinema, The Hindu listed Gundamma Katha, Pathala Bhairavi (1951), Missamma (1955), Mayabazar, Maduve Madi Nodu (1965), Ram Aur Shyam (1967), Julie (1975), and Shriman Shrimati (1982) as the iconic films produced by Nagi Reddi. Gundamma Katha is a notable film in the careers of Suryakantham and Ramana Reddy; Nagi Reddi said the latter played a key role in the film's success. Various words and phrases, such as "dush propaganda" and "alludirikam" (Mother-in-law staying at son-in-law's house), later became part of Telugu vernacular.

In an interview with The Hindu in December 2005, Telugu actor Mallikarjuna Rao cited the film and Mayabazar as examples of incidental comedy, arguing that the situation and the subject should go "hand in hand". In May 2012, Radhika Rajamani of Rediff.com mentioned Gundamma Katha for the letter G in her list, "The A to Z of Telugu Cinema", calling it an "unforgettable film". In November 2012, The Times of India listed Gundamma Katha alongside unrelated films Missamma, Mayabazar, Narthanasala, and Bommarillu (2006) in its list of "Telugu classics to watch along with family this Deepavali". The commentator for The Times stated that Gundamma Katha "touches many layers of human [emotions] and situations" and features "top class actors, a strong script, melodious and meaningful songs". (Note: Diwali, also known as Deepavali or the festival of lights, is an Indian Hindu festival celebrated in the autumn season. Diwali is celebrated using fireworks and lamps. The legends behind this festival are the slaying of Narakasura by Satyabhama, Rama's return to Ayodhya after exile, and an auspicious day to worship Lakshmi for wealth and prosperity.) Seethamma Vakitlo Sirimalle Chettu (2013), which was rumoured to be a remake of Gundamma Katha, adapted the style of its opening credits—use of images rather than text to credit its principal cast. In their 2013 book Routledge Handbook of Indian Cinemas, K. Moti Gokulsing and Wimal Dissanayake wrote that Gundamma Katha, along with Appu Chesi Pappu Koodu (1959), Missamma and Ramudu Bheemudu (1964), "represented the scope comedy had in the 1950s and 60s."

The story and treatment of Gundamma Katha inspired many other Telugu films, resulting in stereotypes in narration. The filmmaker K. V. Reddy stated that Gundamma Katha had good dialogue and production design but lacked a proper story to narrate. In her review of screenwriter Trivikram Srinivas' film Attarintiki Daredi (2013), Sangeetha Devi Dundoo of The Hindu expressed hope that Srinivas "will give us something more innovative than relying on a story that’s been rehashed since the time of Gundamma Katha". In August 2015, the filmmaker Teja admitted that the Telugu film industry is stuck with two types of narratives and concepts—hero-centric films and those similar to Gundamma Katha. During the promotion of Soukhyam (2015), its director A. S. Ravikumar Chowdary said comedy is a dominant element in Telugu films, citing Gundamma Katha and Aha Naa-Pellanta! (1987) as examples.

== Bibliography ==
- Chakravarthy, Vattikuti (3 June 2012). యాభై వసంతాల గుండమ్మ కథ [Fifty Years of Gundamma Katha] (in Telugu).
- Gokulsing, K. Moti; Dissanayake, Wimal (2013). Routledge Handbook of Indian Cinemas. Routledge. ISBN 978-0-415-67774-5.
- Rajadhyaksha, Ashish; Willemen, Paul (1998) [1994]. Encyclopaedia of Indian Cinema (PDF). Oxford University Press. ISBN 0-19-563579-5.
