= Missamma =

1955 film directed by L. V. Prasad

- Theatrical release poster
- Directed by: L. V. Prasad
- Screenplay by: Chakrapani
- Based on: Manmoyee Girls School by Rabindranath Maitra
- Produced by: Nagi Reddi; Chakrapani
- Starring: N. T. Rama Rao; Savitri; Akkineni Nageswara Rao; Jamuna
- Cinematography: Marcus Bartley
- Edited by: C. P. Jambulingam; Kalyanam
- Music by: S. Rajeswara Rao
- Production company: Vijaya Productions
- Release date: 12 January 1955
- Running time: 181 minutes
- Country: India
- Language: Telugu

Missamma (transl. Miss madam) is a 1955 Indian Telugu-language romantic comedy film directed by L. V. Prasad. It was produced by Nagi Reddi and Chakrapani on Vijaya Productions banner. The film stars N. T. Rama Rao, Savitri, Akkineni Nageswara Rao and Jamuna. The script was adapted by Chakrapani from Rabindranath Maitra's Bengali play Manmoyee Girls' School. It revolves around two unemployed people — M. T. Rao and Mary — who pose as a married couple to obtain employment in a high school founded by Gopalam, a zamindar. As Rao and Mary fall in love, Gopalam's nephew A. K. Raju learns that Mary is Gopalam's missing elder daughter Mahalakshmi; she is unaware of her true identity.

Production began in early 1954 with P. Bhanumathi cast as the female lead, though she would eventually be replaced by Savitri. The film was simultaneously shot in Tamil as Missiamma, with an altered cast. Principal photography ended that December; filming was delayed because of Bhanumathi's exit after filming a few reels, and the difficulty of managing two casts simultaneously. C. P. Jambulingam and Kalyanam edited the film; Marcus Bartley was the cinematographer, and S. Rajeswara Rao composed the music. Missamma focused on social issues such as unemployment, corruption, and freedom of worship.

Missamma was released theatrically on 12 January 1955, two days before Missiamma. Both versions were commercially successful, completing 100-day theatrical runs. The bilingual film brought recognition to its cast and studio, and words and phrases from Missamma became part of Telugu vernacular. The film was remade in Hindi as Miss Mary (1957), again directed by Prasad. In the same year, it was adapted into the Marathi film Jhakli Mooth. Bapu, Mullapudi Venkata Ramana and Raavi Kondala Rao rewrote and adapted Missamma as Pelli Pustakam in 1991, with the premise of the original inverted: a married couple pretend to be unmarried to obtain employment.

== Plot ==
Gopalam, the zamindar of Appapuram, establishes a high school in memory of his elder daughter Mahalakshmi, who went missing as a child during a trip to Kakinada. The school suffers from mismanagement under Gopalam's detective nephew, A. K. Raju, and Panthulu, an ayurvedic doctor and teacher who uses students for labour. To reform the institution, Gopalam decides to hire a qualified, married couple to serve as teachers and instruct his younger daughter, Sita, in music and dance.

Meanwhile, Mahalakshmi, who was raised as a Christian named Mary by a Madras-based couple, seeks employment to clear a heavy educational loan taken from a loan shark, I. P. David. To secure the jobs at Gopalam's school, Mary agrees to pose as the wife of M. T. Rao, an unemployed graduate she met at a job interview. Accompanied by Devayya, a clever beggar acting as their cook, Rao and Mary move to Appapuram and take up residence behind Gopalam's bungalow. Gopalam and his wife treat the pair as their own children, making Mary uncomfortable as she struggles with unfamiliar Hindu customs while hiding her identity to earn her salary. Sita develops a crush on Rao during her music lessons, sparking jealousy in Mary, who has also developed feelings for Rao.

When Mary considers confessing the deception, Rao fabricates a story that she is possessed by a Christian spirit to protect their jobs. Even then Mary dresses up like a Christian and sings a song to the Virgin Mary. Raju is suspicious of the couple and eager to keep Rao away from Sita. He begins investigating Mary's background, suspects that she is Mahalakshmi and learns from Gopalam's wife that Mahalakshmi had a mole on her right foot. Gopalam and his wife mistake Mary to be pregnant and organise a Seemantham ceremony, further confusing Mary. They lock Rao and Mary in the top room. Rao tries disguising as a dacoit to frighten Mary into letting him out, but he fails as Mary finally realises who he is after one of the girls outside says that it’s Rao. Rao then jumps off the balcony, terrifying Mary. He comes home, pretending to her that his leg is broken, and she takes care of him. David subsequently arrives in Appapuram to expose Mary's Christian identity after she rejects his marriage proposal in favor of Rao. However, Raju retrieves a stolen necklace that Mahalakshmi wore when she disappeared, proving that Mary is indeed Gopalam's missing daughter. After first, Mary denies it and runs into another room.

David is arrested, and Mary happily acknowledges both her biological and foster families, after her foster father and mother arrive and confirm the other side of the story. Discovering that Rao and Mary are not actually wed, Gopalam arranges their marriage alongside that of Sita and Raju.

== Cast ==
- N. T. Rama Rao as M. T. Rao
- Savitri as Mary / Mahalakshmi
- Akkineni Nageswara Rao as A. K. Raju
- Jamuna as Sita
- S. V. Ranga Rao as Gopalam
- Rushyendramani as Ammi, Gopalam's wife
- Relangi as Devayya
- Ramana Reddy as I. P. David
- Valluri Balakrishna as Govinda
- Doraswamy as Mr. Paul
- Meenakshi as Mrs. Paul
- Allu Ramalingaiah as Panthulu
- Gummadi as the interviewer (cameo appearance)

== Production ==
=== Development ===
Nagi Reddi and Chakrapani signed L. V. Prasad to direct a bilingual film for Vijaya Productions. The script by Chakrapani was based on the Bengali play Manmoyee Girls School by Rabindranath Maitra. Prasad's relationship with Khan, a Muslim tailor near Kohinoor Studios in Bombay (now Mumbai), was the basis of the film's friendship between two men of different religions. The film was titled Missamma in Telugu and Missiamma in Tamil.

Pingali and Thanjai N. Ramaiah Dass wrote the dialogue for the Telugu and Tamil versions, respectively. Marcus Bartley was signed as director of photography, and C. P. Jambulingam and Kalyanam edited the film. Madhavapeddi Gokhale and Kaladhar were its art directors. The film was processed at Vijaya Laboratory and recorded by Western Electric. M. S. Chalapathi Rao and Jagannadham were its executive producers.

=== Casting ===
Missamma/Missiamma was the first bilingual film from Vijaya Productions with different male actors in different versions, in contrast to Pathala Bhairavi (1951) and Pelli Chesi Choodu (1952) where the same actors were used in both versions. The producers cast N. T. Rama Rao as the male lead in the Telugu version and Gemini Ganesan (then known as R. Ganesh) replaced him in Tamil, while P. Bhanumathi was initially cast as the female lead in both versions. S. V. Ranga Rao and Rushyendramani were cast as the female lead's biological parents, and Meenakshi and Doraswamy as her foster parents, in both versions.

Prasad had completed four reels of film with Bhanumathi. She wrote to the producers, informing them that she would shoot only in the afternoon because Varalakshmi Vratam was being held at her home. The letter went astray and Chakrapani, a strict disciplinarian, chastised her for arriving late on set. When Bhanumathi refused to apologise, Chakrapani burnt the four reels in front of her and she quit the film. Although Nagi Reddi learned about the letter and tried to mediate, Chakrapani and Bhanumathi refused to reconcile. Chakrapani ordered Prasad to replace Bhanumathi with Savitri, who was initially cast as Sita. Jamuna was signed later for Sita's role, upon Savitri's recommendation.

After the release of Devadasu (1953), Akkineni Nageswara Rao wanted to trade his tragic-romantic-hero image for a comic role in Missamma, and was cast as the detective A. K. Raju. Nageswara Rao reportedly accepted the role for financial reasons, until he said that Missamma was the only film of his career that he lobbied to participate in. Gummadi was recommended to Chakrapani by Madhavapeddi Venkatramaiah. After auditioning other actors, Chakrapani asked Gummadi to make a cameo appearance as an interviewer. He received ₹500–1,000 for a day's work, (Note: While VJM Diwakar of The New Indian Express quoted Gummadi revealing his salary for Missamma as ₹500, V. Baburao, writing for the Navya weekly reported Gummadi's salary as ₹1000.) a generous salary for the time; actors in major film roles received ₹2,000 for 20 days of work. Chakrapani justified Gummadi's salary by saying that the actor's family included three children who had moved to Madras (now Chennai). For a photoshoot, Rama Rao lent Gummadi his coat and placed a tilaka on his forehead.

=== Filming ===
Principal photography began in early 1954, with both versions (with different casts) filmed simultaneously. The scene in which M. T. Rao and Mary lie to each other before boarding a bus to attend an interview after they were fired from their previous jobs was shot at the Chandamama office building, and the high-school set was built nearby. Photographs of Nagi Reddi's younger brother and cinematographer B. N. Konda Reddi's daughter (the latter as Gopalam's missing daughter) were used in the film. For the scene in which M. T. Rao jumps from a balcony, Gemini Ganesan doubled for Rama Rao.

Pasumarthi Krishnamurthy choreographed the film's songs. For "Balanura Madana" and "Brundavanamadi Andaridi Govindudu Andarivadele", Sita performed a Kuchipudi dance. "Balanura Madana" was a javali dance; Jamuna rehearsed both songs for about a month (since the actress was untrained in traditional dance), focusing on details during rehearsals. Filming was delayed because of Bhanumathi's exit and the difficulty of managing two casts simultaneously. Lasting for a year, it was wrapped up by the end of December 1954. The final length of the film was about 5,683 metres (18,645 ft). After they saw the final edited version, Nagi Reddi and Chakrapani gave Dodge automobiles to the film's principal cast.

== Themes ==
Chakrapani described Missamma as a "film for kids which should also be watched by adults". In his 2015 book Madras Studios: Narrative, Genre, and Ideology in Tamil Cinema, Swarnavel Eswaran Pillai wrote that the film interweaves romantic comedy and melodrama to tell Mary's love story, while Aditya Parankusam of The Hans India described it as a screwball comedy. Andhra Patrika noted in its review that the character of Raju had the shades of Sherlock Holmes, but was portrayed as an amateur detective until the end keeping in view the film's comic tone.

In addition to the protagonists, Missamma focuses on Mary's biological and foster parents. Four other characters—Mary's creditor I. P. David, Rao's friend Devayya, the schoolteacher-cum-doctor Panthulu and Raju's stoic assistant Govinda—influence the plot. Believing that comedy and suspense cannot be effectively sustained together, Chakrapani reveals Mary's true identity to the audience early in the film but the characters (including Mary) are unaware of her identity until the climax. Pa Dheenadhayalan of Dinamani described Mary as the antithesis of Savitri's role in Devadasu. Chakrapani used the reception of Mary's modern dress and behaviour to depict the limitations of orthodox South Indian families. The lyrics of "Adavari Matalaku Ardhale Verule", as lip-synched by Rao's character, describe the complex behaviour of women with men.

According to Pillai, Missamma shed light on the subtle, indirect way Telugu filmmakers dealt with the troublesome environment in Madras surrounding Tamil language and culture during the Visalandhra movement. Pillai wrote that the Krishna-Godavari River dispute between Tamil Nadu and Andhra Pradesh enabled viewers to grasp the metaphor of Pushkaram as signifying loss. (Note: Pushkaram is a traditional 12-day Hindu festival focusing on ancestor worship. It is celebrated every 12 years at 12 Indian rivers when Brihaspati (the personification of Jupiter) enters Leo, the zodiac sign of Surya. Believers consider bathing in a river during Pushkaram auspicious.) The lyrics of "Dharmam Chey" addressed the plight of beggars, and "Kavalante Isthale" addressed society's changing views. "Sitaram Sitaram" was considered a satire of corrupt politicians, particularly the line "Chandalantu Bhale Pracharam, Vandalu Velu tama palaharam" ("Fundraising becomes self-promotion, as hundreds and thousands are used for self-consumption").

Missamma also dealt with unemployment and freedom of religion. Gautaman Bhaskaran of Hindustan Times called it a "powerful social document" that spoke about the importance of religious tolerance with the help of its lead actors. Rama Rao's character, M. T. Rao, is pronounced "Empty" Rao (reflecting, according to Santhisri of Prajasakti, the humiliation of the educated unemployed). Prasad's struggles during his early career influenced the examination of unemployment and being an educated "misfit". Pillai wrote that Chakrapani's "poignant dialogues" about the unemployment of the educated young people belied his image as a mainstream writer; in the scenes where Mary's Catholic faith is challenged, Chakrapani and Prasad "underscore their imperative to highlight the differences" and "make a plea for peaceful co-existence".

== Music ==
The soundtrack of Missamma was composed by S. Rajeswara Rao with lyrics by Pingali. Audio mixing was supervised by A. Krishnan and Siva Ram. They were engineered by N. C. Sen Gupta and orchestrated by A. Krishnamurthy.

When Nagi Reddi told Bhanumathi that P. Leela would sing for her character, Bhanumathi (a playback singer herself) refused to allow Leela to sing for her. After she left the film, Leela was signed to sing for Savitri. Unlike their previous films, Vijaya Productions used A. M. Rajah instead of Ghantasala to sing for Rama Rao. Chakrapani chose P. Susheela to sing the two songs featuring Jamuna after he was impressed by her rendition of "Anuragam Virisena" in Donga Ramudu (1955). Although she sang for Donga Ramudu first, Missamma was released earlier and was her breakthrough as a singer. "Balanura Madana" and its Tamil version, "Ariya Paruvamada", were Susheela's first songs for Rajeswara Rao. Despite singing "Dharmam Chey" and "Sitaram Sitaram", Relangi was not credited as a playback singer.

Missamma's soundtrack was released on His Master's Voice. It was commercially successful, with "Adavari Matalaku Ardhale Verule" becoming a classic love song. Rajeswara Rao's eldest son and musician Ramalingeswara Rao, in an interview to The Hindu, remarked that his father was initially not happy with Missamma's music as he only had to cater to Chakrapani's taste, who had his own view of mainstream cinema. He added that Rajeswara Rao was afraid of failure and rejection from filmmakers, and wanted to leave for Vizianagaram, until the soundtrack's success happened.

== Release ==
Missamma was released on 12 January 1955 and Missiamma two days later, for Pongal. (Note: Pongal is a three-day Indian harvest festival celebrated in Tamil Nadu on 14 January every year as an equivalent of thanksgiving to the nature.) Both versions were commercially successful, completing 100-day theatrical runs.

== Reception ==
Missamma received positive reviews from critics when it was released. For Swatantra magazine, Govindarama (Gora) Sastry praised the film's universal theme and clean, subtle comedy. Andhra Patrika, in its review dated 26 January 1955, noted that the film had strange characterisations which were portrayed by the film's cast competently. The reviewer also praised Chakrapani for this ability to generate humour from grave themes like unemployment and religion. In its February 1955 edition, Kinima magazine called Missamma a film made for everyone, praising Prasad's direction and the performances of the cast. The reviewer praised Chakrapani's sarcastic writing in particular, saying that in creating scenarios and characters, and making them converse, Chakrapani's writing drives the film wildly and amusingly, like he did in Pelli Chesi Choodu. Madhuri Dasagrandhi, writing for Telangana Today in February 2018, felt that Savitri's character was not properly developed. She wrote that Mary was shown to be a Christian practising the Hindu saint Tyagaraja's songs in the beginning, and was later portrayed as someone ignorant of Hindu mythology.

== Adaptations ==
A. V. Meiyappan of AVM Productions approached Nagi Reddi for the film's Hindi remake rights. Reddi insisted that Meiyappan retain Prasad, the director's Bollywood debut. Jamuna reprised her role, while singer Kishore Kumar reprised the role originally played by Nageswara Rao. The Hindi version, Miss Mary, was released in 1957 and was one of the year's highest-grossing films. Composer Hemant Kumar reused the melody of "Brundavanamadi Andaridi Govindudu Andarivadele" from the original as "Brindavan Ka Krishan Kanhaiya". Anant Mane's 1957 Marathi-language film, Jhakli Mooth, was also based on Missamma.

The film's script was re-written by Mullapudi Venkata Ramana and Raavi Kondala Rao for Pelli Pustakam (1991), produced by Ramana and directed by Bapu. The film inverts the plot of Missamma; a married couple pretend to be unmarried to obtain employment. A 70-minute long Telugu-language Off-off-Broadway version of Missamma, written by Athaluri Vijayalakshmi and directed by Rajeswari Udayagiri, was staged on 16, 17, and 18 September 2016 at Johnson and Community theatres in New York City.

== Legacy ==
Missamma was a popular 1950s Telugu film featuring Ramana Reddy and Relangi, considered the Laurel and Hardy of Telugu cinema at the time. According to film historian Film News Anandan, Missamma's success inspired filmmakers to cast different actors for different versions of their films. The phrase "Adavari Matalaku Arthale Verule" became a Telugu idiom and the word "Thailam", used by Devayya in the film, became synonymous with "cash". The film was a breakthrough in the careers of Savitri and Jamuna.

P. Leela sang songs from Missamma in many concerts to a warm response. "Njaan Ariyathen", from the Malayalam-language film Jailppulli (1957), is loosely based on "Brundavanamadi Andaridi Govindudu Andarivadele". Prasad and Chakrapani later collaborated on Appu Chesi Pappu Koodu (1959), an above-average grosser before its profitable re-release. In their 2013 book, Routledge Handbook of Indian Cinemas, K. Moti Gokulsing and Wimal Dissanayake wrote that Appu Chesi Pappu Koodu, Missamma, Gundamma Katha (1962) and Ramudu Bheemudu (1964) "represented the scope comedy had in the 1950s and '60s." The storyline of Marunnattil Oru Malayali (1971) was noted for its similarity to Missamma, since its female lead (a Christian) acts like a Brahmin girl. According to B. Vijayakumar of The Hindu, this prompted Chakrapani to remake the film in Telugu as Sri Rajeswari Vilas Coffee Club in 1976.

"Adavari Matalaku Arthale Verule" was remixed by Mani Sharma without altering its melody and lyrics for the Telugu-language film, Kushi (2001). It was sung by Korivi Muralidhar, who was known as "Kushi" Murali after the remixed version's success. Although Neelakanta entitled his 2003 comedy film Missamma, it had no other similarity to the original. The 2010 independent Telugu film Missamma NRI was a variation on Missamma, focusing on two immigrants who enter into a sham marriage. In September 2006, M. L. Narasimham listed Missamma with Shavukaru (1950), Samsaram (1950), Pelli Chesi Choodu, Manohara (1954) and Appu Chesi Pappu Koodu as acclaimed films by the director after the release of Mana Desam (1949) and his association with Vijaya Productions.

Hyderabad-based Goldstone Technologies acquired the film-negative rights of 14 Telugu films produced by Vijaya Vauhini Studios in late November 2007, including Mayabazar (1957) and Missamma, to release digitally re-mastered versions in colour. Although the digitally remastered and colourised version of Mayabazar released in January 2010 was commercially successful, Goldstone decided not to remaster the remaining 14 films and said that most of the producers who sold the film-negative rights to TV channels lost control of them. According to Goldstone, ownership and copyright issues were an impediment. However, the colourised version of "Brundavanamadi Andaridi Govindudu Andarivadele" was used in the opening credits of Brindavanam (2010).

Commemorating the centenary of Indian cinema, The Hindu listed Missamma, Pathala Bhairavi, Mayabazar, Gundamma Katha, Maduve Madi Nodu (1965), Ram Aur Shyam (1967), Julie (1975) and Shriman Shrimati (1982) as iconic films produced by Nagi Reddi. Hussain Sha Kiran, who co-wrote Sukumar's Nannaku Prematho (2016), entitled his directorial debut Meeku Meere Maaku Meme after a scene in Missamma in which Mary tries to teach Raju music.

== Sources ==
- Baburao, V. (18 May 2005). "మిస్సమ్మ – నిరుద్యోగ సమస్యపై వ్యంగ్యాస్త్రం" [Missamma – A satire on Unemployment]. Navya Weekly (in Telugu).
- Gokulsing, K. Moti; Dissanayake, Wimal (2013). Routledge Handbook of Indian Cinemas. Routledge. ISBN 978-0-415-67774-5.
- Pillai, Swarnavel Eswaran (2015). Madras Studios: Narrative, Genre, and Ideology in Tamil Cinema. SAGE Publications. ISBN 978-93-5150-212-8.
- Rajadhyaksha, Ashish; Willemen, Paul (1998) [1994]. Encyclopaedia of Indian Cinema (PDF). British Film Institute and Oxford University Press. ISBN 0-19-563579-5.
