= Pelli Chesi Choodu =

1952 film by L. V. Prasad

- Theatrical release poster
- Directed by: L. V. Prasad
- Written by: Chakrapani
- Produced by: Nagi Reddi; Chakrapani
- Starring: N. T. Rama Rao; G. Varalakshmi; Yandamuri Joga Rao; Savitri; S. V. Ranga Rao
- Cinematography: Marcus Bartley
- Edited by: C. P. Jambulingam; M. S. Money
- Music by: Ghantasala
- Production company: Vijaya Productions
- Distributed by: Vijaya Productions
- Release date: 29 February 1952
- Running time: 156 minutes
- Country: India
- Languages: Telugu; Tamil

Pelli Chesi Choodu (transl. Try getting married) is a 1952 Indian satirical comedy film directed by L. V. Prasad and produced by Nagi Reddi and Chakrapani under their company Vijaya Productions. The film was made simultaneously in Telugu and Tamil, the latter titled Kalyanam Panni Paar (transl. Try getting married). It stars N. T. Rama Rao, G. Varalakshmi, Yandamuri Joga Rao and Savitri. S. V. Ranga Rao, Sivarama Krishnayya, Doraswamy, and Suryakantham play supporting roles in the Telugu version while C. V. V. Panthulu replaced Krishnayya in Tamil.

Pelli Chesi Choodu deals with the negative effects of the dowry system in India through the marital life of Venkata Ramana (Rama Rao) and Ammadu (Varalakshmi). The film's production began after the release of Vijaya Productions' Pathala Bhairavi (1951). Marcus Bartley was recruited as the cinematographer and the film was edited by C. P. Jambulingam and M. S. Money. Ghantasala composed the film's music.

Pelli Chesi Choodu was released on 29 February 1952 while Kalyanam Panni Paar was released on 15 August that year. Both versions were commercially successful and achieved cult status. Moreover, Kalyanam Panni Paar was known to be the first South Indian film to contain sequences in Gevacolor. However, the Telugu version did not contain sequences in colour. Pelli Chesi Choodu was then remade in Kannada as Maduve Madi Nodu (1965) by Vijaya Productions and in Hindi as Shaadi Ke Baad (1972) by Prasad. While the Kannada version was commercially successful, the Hindi version was not.

== Plot ==
Rathamma lives in a village with her sons Raja and Kundu, and her daughter Ammadu. Raja is a teacher and a theatre enthusiast. Along with Kundu and a group of fellow actors, Raja performs plays in a local theatre during his free time. Raja's maternal uncle Govindayya, a pleader, wants him to marry his daughter Chitti, who is in a relationship with Bheemudu, a bodybuilder. Raja rejects the proposal and Govindayya offers to find a suitable bridegroom for Ammadu if Raja marries Chitti. Raja rejects the proposal and with Kundu he sets out to find a suitable bridegroom for Ammadu.

In a distant village, Raja and Kundu meet Dhoopati Viyyanna, a zamindar and the president of the panchayat. Viyyanna is a complex character of declining fortunes and a generous spirit who believes in respecting his guests. Raja and Viyyanna's daughter Savitri fall in love and their wedding is quickly arranged. Viyyanna also finds a bridegroom named Venkata Ramana, a pleader living in Madras, for Ammadu. Ramana's father, Venkatapathy, demands a large dowry, which Viyyanna promises to pay.

At the marriage venue, Govindayya plots revenge by inciting Venkatapathy to insist on the dowry being paid before the marriage. Viyyanna issues a promissory note; Venkatapathy rejects it and drags Ramana from the marriage hall. However, Ramana leaves for Madras and lives there with Ammadu. When Venkatapathy arrives, Ramana feigns mental illness while Ammadu and Raja pretend to be a nurse and a doctor. Ammadu endears herself to Venkatapathy by showing interest in his recitals of the puranas.

Ramana 'recovers' from the mental illness and Ammadu, who has been pregnant, gives birth to their son, causing a fresh round of gossip in the village. Govindayya tries to take advantage of this and after numerous failed attempts, he persuades Venkatapathy to conduct Ramana's marriage with Chitti. Viyyanna considers this to be an insult and conducts the marriage of Chitti and Bheemudu at his residence. Govindayya and his wife Chukkalamma refuse to acknowledge the marriage.

When Venkatapathy asks Ramana to marry Chitti, he refuses and foregoes the wealth he is entitled to inherit in exchange for Ammadu and their newborn son. Govindayya asks Venkatapathy to marry Chitti and Chukkalamma protests, reuniting Chitti and Bheemudu. A helpless Govindayya is confronted by Viyyanna, who threatens to use his influence as a president of the panchayat to have him arrested if he does not reform himself. Govindayya begs pardon and flees with his family. The film ends with everyone present in Ramana's house, laughing maniacally.

== Cast ==
- N. T. Rama Rao as Venkata Ramana
- G. Varalakshmi as Ammadu
- Yandamuri Joga Rao as Raja
- Savitri as Savitri
- S. V. Ranga Rao as Dhoopati Viyyanna
- Sivarama Krishnayya (Telugu) and C. V. V. Panthulu (Tamil) as Venkatapathy
- T. N. Meenakshi as Rathamma
- Doraswamy as Govindayya
- Suryakantham as Chukkalamma
- Pushpalatha as Chitti
- Mahankali Venkaiah as Bheemudu
- Gade Balakrishna "Kundu" Rao as Kundu
- Valluri Balakrishna as Ramana's assistant
- Chadalavada as Viyyanna's assistant
- Padmanabham as Viyyanna's assistant and a postman (cameo appearance)
- L. V. Prasad in a cameo appearance
- B. Venkatarami Reddy in a cameo appearance

== Production ==
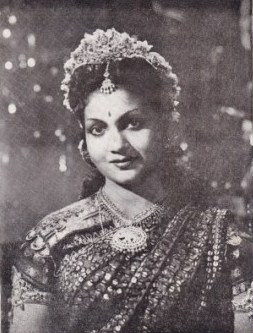
When differences arose between Chakrapani and G. Varalakshmi, the former wanted to scrap the near-complete film and replace her with Anjali Devi (pictured). Devi however mediated between them and solved the differences.

After producing Shavukaru (1950) and Pathala Bhairavi (1951), Nagi Reddi and Chakrapani announced a film titled Pelli Chesi Choodu, which would be directed by L. V. Prasad and financed by their company Vijaya Productions. Pelli Chesi Choodu was made as a bilingual film; it was shot simultaneously in Telugu and Tamil, with the Tamil version titled Kalyanam Panni Paar, the first Tamil film directed by Prasad. Chakrapani wrote the film's script, which was based on the negative effects of the dowry system in India. Marcus Bartley was recruited as the cinematographer and the film was edited by C. P. Jambulingam and M. S. Money. Madhavapeddi Gokhale and Kaladhar were the film's art directors, and the music score was composed by Ghantasala. Chalapathi Rao and Jagannadham were the production executives. Pasumarthi Krishnamurthy choreographed the song sequences. T. Prakash Rao worked as an assistant director under Prasad; Rao directed Palletooru (1952) during the post-production phase of Pelli Chesi Choodu. Kalyanam Panni Paar was partly colourised using Gevacolor.

N. T. Rama Rao and G. Varalakshmi were chosen as one of the leading pairs of actors. During the songs' shoot, Ghantasala taught Rama Rao to play the harmonium and gave him a few music lessons so he would look believable in the film. Yandamuri Jogarao and Savitri, who had played minor roles in Shavukar and Pathala Bhairavi, were chosen as the other leading pair. In playing the role of the zamindar, S. V. Ranga Rao exhibited a strange body language, inspired by a stranger he had observed at a railway station. Sivarama Krishnayya and C. V. V. Panthulu played the role of Rama Rao's father in the Telugu and Tamil versions. Padmanabham played two roles; a postman and Ranga Rao's friend.

The child artists in the film were members of Nyapathi Raghavarao's 'Balanandam' troupe. They were trained by Gnapadi Kameswara Rao, whose nephew Gade Balakrishna "Kundu" Rao played a key role in the film's Telugu and Tamil versions. Vijaya Productions hired actors on a monthly salaried basis for this film; one of these was M. Mallikarjuna Rao, who later directed films Prameelarjuneeyam (1965), Muhurtha Balam (1969), and Gudachari 116 (1976). Differences between Chakrapani and Varalakshmi occurred during the last stage of principal photography. Chakrapani wanted to replace Varalakshmi with Anjali Devi and reshoot the entire film. However, Devi mediated between them and resolved the differences.

Differences between Rama Rao and Varalakshmi due to the latter's tantrums, also occurred. When Varalakshmi refused to touch Rama Rao's feet in the scene in which his father drags him from the marriage hall, Prasad asked Nagi Reddy's son B. L. N. Prasad—the second assistant cameraman working under Bartley—to wear a dhoti and stand before her. Chakrapani liked a scene in a play in which a group of police officers in ascending hierarchy, each junior gave up his chair for the senior; he used the same idea in Savitri's marriage sequences in the film. Similarly, Prasad incorporated part of a stage play enacted by children into the film, which Nagi Reddy's son Venkatarami Reddy was a part of. Prasad also made a cameo appearance in the film. Mohan Kanda, who later became the Chief Secretary of Andhra Pradesh before its bifurcation, also appeared in the film as a child artist. The final reel length of both versions was 5,243 metres (17,201 ft).

== Music ==
The official soundtracks of Pelli Chesi Choodu and Kalyanam Panni Paar were composed by Ghantasala. The sound mixing process was supervised by A. Krishnan and Siva Ram. The soundtrack was processed by N. C. Sen Gupta and was orchestrated by Master Venu. This was Ghantasala's third film as a music director under his five-film contract with Vijaya Productions. Utkuri Satyanarayana wrote the lyrics for "Amma Noppule" and "Brahmayya O Brahmayya", while Pingali wrote the lyrics for the other fifteen songs. Four of the songs featured the child artists. The song "Ezhumalai Andavaney", sung by P. Leela for Kalyanam Panni Paar, is based on the carnatic raga known as Chakravakam.

The song "Pelli Chesukoni" was composed using the Kalyani raga. Ghantasala recorded the songs "Manasa Nenevaro Neeku Thelusa" and "Yedukondalavada Venkataramana" first with Jikki. He was not satisfied and recorded them again with P. Leela; the soundtrack's gramophone records featured both versions. The soundtrack was released in December 1952 under the Saregama music label. (Note: iTunes estimates the release date as 1 December 1952, whereas Gaana estimates the release date as 31 December 1952.) It was a critical and commercial success, Ashish Rajadhyaksha and Paul Willemen, in their book Encyclopaedia of Indian Cinema, termed the songs "Amma Nopule" and "Pelli Chesukoni" as "especially popular".

Telugu Track list
No.	Title	Lyrics	Artist(s)	Length
1.	"Yevaro Yevaro"	Pingali	Ghantasala, P. Leela	03:19
2.	"Raadhanuraayedavaku"	Pingali	Garikapati Varalakshmi, Ghantasala, Joga Rao, P. Leela	05:38
3.	"Yevadosthado Choosthaga"	Pingali	G. Bharathi, Ghantasala	01:51
4.	"Brahmayya O Brahmayya"	Utukuri Satyanarayana	A. P. Komala, K. Rani, T. M. Sarojini	06:29
5.	"Yekkadoyi Priya"	Pingali	P. Leela, Pithapuram Nageswara Rao	04:07
6.	"Amma Noppule"	Utukuri Satyanarayana	V. Ramakrishna, Sakuntala	03:13
7.	"Pellichesi Choopisthaam"	Pingali	Pithapuram Nageswara Rao	02:44
8.	"Yechati Nundi"	Pingali	V. Ramakrishna, T. M. Sarojini	00:55
9.	"Yevoori Dhaanavey"	Pingali	V. Ramakrishna, T. M. Sarojini	02:34
10.	"Manasa Nenevaro Neeku Thelusa"	Pingali	P. Leela	02:49
11.	"Manasuloni Manasa"	Pingali	Ghantasala	02:42
12.	"Yedukondalavada Venkataramana"	Pingali	P. Leela	02:58
13.	"Bhayamenduke Chitte"	Pingali	Ghantasala	02:03
14.	"O Bhavi Bharatha"	Pingali	Ghantasala	03:23
15.	"Pelli Chesukoni"	Pingali	Ghantasala	03:23
16.	"Ee Jagamantha Natika"	Pingali	Ghantasala	01:43
17.	"Povamma Bali Kaavamma"	Pingali	V. J. Varma	03:25
Total length:				51:16

Tamil Track list
No.	Title	Lyrics	Artist(s)	Length
1.	"Yaaro Yaaro"	Thanjai N. Ramaiah Dass	Ghantasala, P. Leela	03:19
2.	"Azhuvaadhe Azhuvaadhe"	Thanjai N. Ramaiah Dass	Pithapuram Nageswara Rao, P. Leela, Udutha Sarojini	05:38
3.	"Evan Vandhalum Vida Matten"	Thanjai N. Ramaiah Dass	Ghantasala, K. Rani	01:51
4.	"Brammave Ye Brammave"	Thanjai N. Ramaiah Dass	P. Leela, K. Rani, Udutha Sarojini	06:29
5.	"Engu Sendraayo Priyaa"	Thanjai N. Ramaiah Dass	P. Leela, Pithapuram Nageswara Rao, K. Rani	04:07
6.	"Amma Novudhe"	Thanjai N. Ramaiah Dass	K. Rani, Udutha Sarojini	03:13
7.	"Kalyanam Seidhu Kattiduvom"	Thanjai N. Ramaiah Dass	Pithapuram Nageswara Rao, K. Rani	02:44
8.	"Emaali Endha Ooro"	Thanjai N. Ramaiah Dass	K. Rani, Udutha Sarojini	00:55
9.	"Endha Ooru Pennu Nee"	Thanjai N. Ramaiah Dass	V. Ramakrishna, Udutha Sarojini	02:34
10.	"Maname Ennai Arivaayo"	Thanjai N. Ramaiah Dass	P. Leela	02:49
11.	"Radhaiyadaa Un Raadhaiyadaa"	Thanjai N. Ramaiah Dass	Ghantasala	02:42
12.	"Ezhumalai Aaandavane Venkataramana"	Thanjai N. Ramaiah Dass	P. Leela	02:58
13.	"Bayam Enadi Kutti"	Thanjai N. Ramaiah Dass	Ghantasala	02:03
14.	"En Indha Chutti Thaname"	Thanjai N. Ramaiah Dass	Ghantasala	03:23
15.	"Maalai Soodi Kondu"	Thanjai N. Ramaiah Dass	Ghantasala, Pithapuram Nageswara Rao	03:23
16.	"Jegamellam Oru Nadaga Medai"	Thanjai N. Ramaiah Dass	Ghantasala	01:43
17.	"Vaazhvedhu Suga Vaazhvedhu"	Thanjai N. Ramaiah Dass	V. J. Varma	03:25
Total length:				51:16

== Release ==
Pelli Chesi Choodu had its theatrical release on 29 February 1952, and Kalyanam Panni Paar on 15 August 1952. Both versions were commercially successful; the Telugu version completing a 100-day run in 11 centres, and the Tamil version completed a 100-day run in many centres. (Note: M. L. Narasimham of The Hindu did not mention the number of centres.) The Telugu version completed a 182-day run at Durga Kala Mandiram, Vijayawada, where celebrations marking the film's success were held. Rama Rao and Varalakshmi did not attend the event because of the differences between them.

== Reception ==
On 2 March 1952, a reviewer from Andhra Patrika appreciated the makers for their critique on a societal issue in a humorous yet responsible manner. On 7 March 1952, a critic from Zamin Ryot praised the performances of the star cast. They added that Pelli Chesi Choodu is a rare film in that it not only addresses a social issue in an entertaining way but would also be noted for its unique characterisations.

Reviewing the film, M. L. Narasimham of The Hindu called Pelli Chesi Choodu a "text-book for filmmakers" on "how to make a clean and wholesome entertainer on a burning issue without resorting to slogan-mongering, and yet driving home the point in a subtle manner". Narasimham also said the actors "deserved full marks for excellent performance" in the film. In his book Alanati Chalana Chitram, K. N. T. Sastry wrote that Pelli Chesi Choodu is an ensemble comedy that "abounds in intrigues and disguises gearing to the making and breaking of marriage alliances".

== Legacy ==
According to the film historian Randor Guy, Pelli Chesi Choodu was the first in a series of satirical comedies directed by Prasad and produced by Vijaya Productions. Guy said the film's box office performance made Prasad famous in both Telugu and Tamil cinema. After Pelli Chesi Choodu, Prasad and Vijaya Productions collaborated on Missamma (1955) and Appu Chesi Pappu Koodu (1959). All three films were profitable ventures and achieved cult status in Telugu cinema. Pelli Chesi Choodu is considered as one of the acclaimed films in the careers of Prasad and Varalakshmi. Pelli Chesi Choodu was also used as the title of a 2014 theatrical play staged by Sri Sai Arts, which won a Nandi Award.

== Remakes and colourisation plans ==
Vijaya Productions remade the film in Kannada as Maduve Madi Nodu (1965). It was directed by Hunsur Krishnamurthy and stars Rajkumar and Leelavathi. Maduve Madi Nodu was a profitable venture. Prasad remade the film in Hindi as Shaadi Ke Baad (1972), in which Jeetendra, Raakhee and Shatrughan Sinha reprised the roles played by Rama Rao, Varalakshmi and Ranga Rao in the original. Shaadi Ke Baad underperformed at the box office.

In late November 2007, a Hyderabad-based company named Goldstone Technologies acquired the film negative rights to 14 Telugu films produced by Vijaya Vauhini Studios, including Mayabazar (1957) and Pelli Chesi Choodu, to release digitally re-mastered versions in colour. The remastered and colourised version of Mayabazar was released in January 2010 and performed well in theatres, but Goldstone Technologies decided not to remaster the remaining 14 films, including Pelli Chesi Choodu; the company said most of the producers who sold the rights of the negatives to television channels lost control over them. Goldstone added that there were many legal issues over ownership and copyright whenever other producers tried to do something on their own.

== Bibliography ==
- Pillai, Swarnavel Eswaran (2015). Madras Studios: Narrative, Genre, and Ideology in Tamil Cinema. SAGE Publications. ISBN 978-93-515-0121-3.
- Rajadhyaksha, Ashish; Willemen, Paul (1998) [1994]. Encyclopaedia of Indian Cinema. British Film Institute and Oxford University Press. ISBN 0-19-563579-5.
