= Manithan Maravillai =

1962 film by Aluri Chakrapani

- Theatrical release poster
- Directed by: Chakrapani
- Screenplay by: Chakrapani
- Produced by: Nagi Reddi; Chakrapani
- Starring: Gemini Ganesan; Akkineni Nageswara Rao; Savitri; Jamuna
- Cinematography: Marcus Bartley
- Edited by: G. Kalyana Sundaram; D. G. Jayaraman
- Music by: Ghantasala
- Production company: Vijaya Productions
- Distributed by: Vijaya Productions
- Release date: 8 June 1962
- Running time: 166 minutes
- Country: India
- Language: Tamil

Manithan Maravillai (transl. Man has not changed) is a 1962 Indian Tamil-language comedy drama film written, and directed by Chakrapani. He also co-produced it along with Nagi Reddi under Vijaya Productions. It was simultaneously shot in Telugu as Gundamma Katha, which itself is based on the 1958 Kannada film Mane Thumbida Hennu.

The film starred Gemini Ganesan, Akkineni Nageswara Rao, Savitri and Jamuna, with Sundari Bai, S. V. Ranga Rao, K. Sarangapani, L. Vijayalakshmi, Lakshmi Prabha Raja and T. K. Ramachandran in supporting roles. It revolves around a proud mother, Subbamma, and the way she handles her two sons-in-law. Manithan Maravillai was released on 8 June 1962.

== Plot ==
Subbamma (Sundari Bai) is a wealthy widow with a daughter, Saroja (Jamuna); a son, Prabhakar (Raja), and a stepdaughter, Lakshmi (Savitri). Although the girls are beautiful and intelligent, Saroja is spoiled and Lakshmi is treated like a servant. Chithambaranar (S.V. Ranga Rao), a good friend of Subbamma's late husband with two sons, is searching for suitable brides. Subbamma is interested in Chithambaranar's son for Saroja, and sends word through an intermediary. She wants to marry Lakshmi off to just anyone to avoid accusations of neglecting her stepdaughter. Kuppusamy (K. Sarangapani), Subbamma's brother, wants Saroja to marry his son Boopathy (T. K. Ramachandran)—who is in prison.

Chithambaranar and his sons, aware of Subbamma's greed and her treatment of her daughters, teach her a lesson. After deciding that Lakshmi will make a suitable match for his older son Panjacharam (Gemini Ganesan) and Saroja for his second son Raja (Akkineni Nageswara Rao), Chithambaram asks his sons to play roles. Panjacharam enters Subbamma's house as Panji, a homeless servant who wins her heart (and a job). Raja—with the aid of his cousin, Padma (L. Vijayalakshmi)—enters as Prabhakar, woos her and wins her heart. Panji, with his humility and wit, wins Lakshmi's heart and asks Subbamma for her daughter's hand in marriage. Subbamma agrees, and Panji marries Lakshmi.

Subbamma is impressed by Prabhakar for Saroja, and plans for the wedding. She receives a letter from Chithambaram that he is no longer interested in the alliance because Subbamma allegedly poisoned her husband, but Saroja wants to marry Prabhakar. Subbamma obliges, after Panji convinces her that a son-in-law in her home will be no problem and she can enjoy the company of her beloved daughter even after her marriage. After Saroja's marriage, Prabhakar (Raja) is fascinated by Padma and wants to marry her instead; Panji convinces Subbamma. Subbamma and Saroja soon realise that Prabhakar is a drunkard and a thief, and Subbamma opposes his marriage to Padma (which happens anyway).

Prabhakar intensifies his acting as a drunkard, and pretends that he is not Chithambaram's son but a vagabond who is wanted for theft. As Subbamma's problems accumulate, Padma's paternal aunt Kaveri (Lakshmi Prabha) appears. Prabhakar leaves Saroja and writes, asking her to join him. Saroja obliges, and leaves Subbamma's house against her wishes. Kuppusamy's son Boopathy, just released from prison, torments Subbamma. Without Prabhakar, Subbamma is confined to her outhouse by Padma's boisterous aunt and Kuppusmay's prison-educated son. Panji also leaves the house with Lakshmi, installing her in Chithambaram's bungalow as mistress of the house and his daughter-in-law. Living a better life, she is still concerned about Subbamma and Saroja. Saroja is introduced as a gardener by Prabhakar, and is treated like a servant by Chithambaram. Saroja's conceit and arrogance evaporate, changing her personality, and Subbamma is humbled by the chaos. Lakshmi visits the despairing Subbamma, evicts Kaveri and Boopathy with Panji's help and brings Subbamma to Chithambaram's house. Saroja leaves Chithambaram's house and encounters Lakshmi, who tells her that they are Chithambaram's daughters-in-law; Prabhakar's drunkenness and theft were an act by his sons (now their husbands). Subbamma, happy to see them both married into a good family, continues to live with Chithambaram's family.

== Cast ==
- Gemini Ganesan as Panjacharam
- A. Nageswara Rao as Raja
- Savitri as Lakshmi (Subbamma's Step daughter)
- Jamuna as Saroja (Subbamma's Daughter)
- Sundari Bai as Subbamma
- S. V. Ranga Rao as Chithambaranar (Panji& Raja's father)
- K. Sarangapani as Kuppusamy (Subbamma's Brother)
- L. Vijayalakshmi as Padma (Raja & Panji's Cousin)
- Raja as Prabhakar (Saroja's Brother)
- Lakshmi Prabha as Kaveri (Padma's Anuty)
- C. T. Rajakantham as Chokki (Kuppusamy's Wife)
- T. K. Ramachandran as Boopathy (Kuppusamy's son)
- Nagesh as Cameo appearance
- Serukalathur Sama

== Production ==
Manithan Maravillai and its Telugu version Gundamma Katha, were based on the Kannada film Mane Thumbida Hennu (1958). The screenplay was written by Chakrapani, who also co-produced the film with Nagi Reddi under Vijaya Productions; Chakrapani and Reddi also produced the Telugu original. Akkineni Nageswara Rao, who appeared as one of the male leads in Gundamma Katha, reprised his role in Manithan Maravillai, which was his 100th film as an actor, while Gemini Ganesan was cast as the other male lead, reprising the role originally played by N. T. Rama Rao. Cinematography was handled by Marcus Bartley.

== Soundtrack ==
The soundtrack was composed by Ghantasala.

Song	Singer	Lyrics	Length
"Om Sarvam Sakthi Mayam Paaru"	Seerkazhi Govindarajan	Thanjai N. Ramaiah Dass	2:34
"Kanmaniye Un Idhaya"	K. P. Udayabhanu	Thanjai N. Ramaiah Dass	2:38
"Thendral Paadavum"	P. Susheela	Thanjai N. Ramaiah Dass	3:30
"Thendral Paadavum" - 2	P. Susheela	Thanjai N. Ramaiah Dass	3:10
"Podu Podu Thekka Podu"	Seerkazhi Govindarajan, P. Susheela, P. Leela & Ghantasala	Thanjai N. Ramaiah Dass	3:01
"Inbamaana Iravidhuve"	A. L. Raghavan & P. Susheela	Thanjai N. Ramaiah Dass	3:03
"Kadhal Yathiraikku"	A. L. Raghavan & P. Susheela	Thanjai N. Ramaiah Dass	3:10
"Kaalathai Maatrinaan"	Seerkazhi Govindarajan & P. Leela	Kannadasan	2:56
"Kurumbinilum Oru"	P. Susheela	Kannadasan	3:09

== Release and reception ==
Manithan Maravillai was released on 8 June 1962. The Indian Express lauded the film, particularly Chakrapani's screenplay and direction, and the performances of Ganesan, Nageswara Rao, Savitri and Jamuna. Despite that, it failed commercially.
