= Shaadi Ke Baad =

- Poster
- Directed by: L.V. Prasad
- Written by: Vishwamittera Adil (dialogues)
- Story by: Chakrapani
- Based on: Pelli Chesi Choodu (1952)
- Produced by: L.V. Prasad
- Starring: Jeetendra; Raakhee; Shatrughan Sinha
- Cinematography: Dwarka Diwecha
- Edited by: Shivaji Awdhut
- Music by: Laxmikant–Pyarelal
- Production company: Prasad Productions Pvt Ltd
- Release date: 18 March 1972
- Running time: 135 minutes
- Country: India
- Language: Hindi

Shaadi Ke Baad (transl. After the marriage) is a 1972 Hindi-language comedy film, produced and directed by L. V. Prasad under the Prasad Productions Pvt Ltd banner. It stars Jeetendra, Raakhee, Shatrughan Sinha and music composed by Laxmikant–Pyarelal. The film is a remake of Telugu film Pelli Chesi Choodu (1952).

== Cast ==
- Jeetendra as Advocate Shyam B. Ram
- Raakhee as Shobha S. Ram
- Shatrughan Sinha as Choudhury Bishan Swaroop Singh
- Asrani as Ramu
- Shekhar Purohit as Bhagat Ram
- Paintal as Raju "Masterji"
- Master Satyajeet as Chabiley
- C.S. Dubey as Advocate Govind
- Viju Khote
- V. Gopal
- Leela Mishra as Parvati
- Tabassum as Basanti
- Shyama as Basanti's mother
- Kumari Naaz as Savitri B. Singh

== Soundtrack ==
#	Title	Singer(s)
1	"Brahma O Brahma"	Lata Mangeshkar, Manna Dey
2	"Phur Se Udh Jaati Thi"	Mohammed Rafi
3	"Soja Re Soja Chale"	Lata Mangeshkar
4	"Dekh Ri Dekh"	Lata Mangeshkar, Mahendra Kapoor
5	"Oh Chhodo Kalai"	Lata Mangeshkar
