= Appu Chesi Pappu Koodu =

1959 film by L. V. Prasad

- Theatrical-release poster
- Directed by: L. V. Prasad
- Written by: Chakrapani; L. V. Prasad; Vempati Sadasivabrahmam
- Produced by: Nagi Reddy; Chakrapani
- Starring: N. T. Rama Rao; Savitri; Jamuna; Jaggayya
- Cinematography: Marcus Bartley
- Edited by: G. Kalyanasundaram; K. Radhakrishna
- Music by: S. Rajeswara Rao
- Production company: Vijaya Productions
- Release date: 14 January 1959
- Running time: 158 minutes
- Country: India
- Language: Telugu

Appu Chesi Pappu Koodu (transl. Live Comfortably on Credit) (Note: More specifically, this is a metaphor that literally translates to "eating dal (that is to say, eating well) by going into debt", with the implication that a debtor is enjoying an unearned or undeserved lifestyle.) is a 1959 Indian Telugu-language comedy drama film directed and co-written by L. V. Prasad. The film was produced by Nagi Reddi and Chakrapani of Vijaya Productions; the latter co-wrote its script with Prasad and Vempati Sadasivabrahmam. It is the Telugu version of Prasad's Tamil film Kadan Vaangi Kalyaanam (1958). Starring N. T. Rama Rao, Relangi and Savitri, Appu Chesi Pappu Koodu features Jaggayya, C. S. R. Anjaneyulu, S. V. Ranga Rao, and Jamuna in supporting roles. The conflict between two older men with different mindsets—Ramadasu (an eternal, devious debtor) and Mukundarao (a generous, rich gentleman with fake prestige)—is the film's centrepiece.

Production began after the success of Mayabazar (1957), with M. S. Chalapathi Rao and Jagannadham the film's executive producers. Marcus Bartley was the director of photography. S. Rajeswara Rao composed the soundtrack and background score. G. Kalyanasundaram and K. Radhakrishna edited the film, and Madhavapeddi Gokhale and Kaladhar were its art directors. The film is shown almost entirely in black and white, with the exception of a dance sequence filmed in Gevacolor.

Appu Chesi Pappu Koodu was released on 14 January 1959, during the Makara Sankranti festival season. With average returns during its first four weeks, the film eventually became an above-average grosser and its re-release was profitable. It has cult status in Telugu cinema, and is an acclaimed Prasad film. Goldstone Technologies announced that they would attempt to digitise the film in 2007, but abandoned the attempt three years later.

== Plot ==
Ramadasu is a zamindar who recently acquired the colonial title of Rao Bahadur, and is also a perennial debtor who believes in leading a luxurious life on credit. Dewan Bahadur Mukunda Rao, a wealthy, generous but naive zamindar, is always searching for a groom of royal or high social standing for his granddaughter Manjari. While Ramadasu also occasionally borrows from Rao, he secretly wishes to have Manjari married to his son Raghu, so that Rao's wealth becomes his, enabling him to pay his debts. Complicating things is Raghu's earlier marriage in his childhood to Leela, whose brother Raja is in prison for his participation in the Indian independence movement. In order to get more credit, Ramadasu uses his assistant, Bhaja Govindam, to find more lenders and placate angry creditors with false promises. Behind Govindam's back, however, Ramadasu bribes Govindam's uncle and Rao's assistant, Ramalingam, with the promise of getting Ramalingam's daughter, Usha, whom Govindam is in love with, married. Rao, unaware of the deception, agrees to the alliance.

Fed up with his boss's backstabbing, Govindam, Usha, and Manjari conspire to stop the wedding. Raja is released from prison after serving his sentence and is briefed about the situation. Raja and Manjari were in love during their college days, and she tells him about Ramadasu's intentions. Raja confronts Ramadasu about his sister's ill treatment and gets into a scuffle with his bodyguard. Ramadasu offers to let Leela stay in the house on the condition that she becomes a mute servant. After Raghu arrives from London, Ramadasu misleads him into thinking that Leela has died. As part of his plan, Govindam has Raja disguised as Prince Bonkulamarri Raja, a royal prince and businessman, and introduces him to Mukunda Rao. Rao, impressed with Raja, considers him a suitable bridegroom for Manjari. One night, Raghu overhears Leela speaking to Raja and confronts Chenchalayya, Ramadasu's servant, who divulges her identity and Raja's secret. Raghu meets with Govindam and is briefed about the plan, but asks him not to tell anyone. Raghu then continues to flirt with Manjari and play the prospective bridegroom, while also trying to tease Leela, much to Ramadasu's chagrin. The plan nearly goes smoothly until Ramadasu sends his bodyguards to attack and rob Raja, but he dispatches them, leading to his identity being exposed. Forced to leave for his sister's sake, Raja instead dons a new disguise with Govindam's help. In the meantime, Ramadasu forces Rao to accept the former's proposal, threatening to ruin his reputation. Now disguised as Sarva Baksha Swamy, a holy man, Raja first tricks Ramalingam into thinking his daughter has rejected Govindam, leading to Govindam requesting to become an ascetic. As a result, Ramalingam persuades Mukunda Rao to seek Raja's help to convert Manjari to accept Raghu. In the meantime, Govindam has one of his own theatre group members pose as a prospective match and offer ornaments as a sign of alliance, so that he can steal them and place his uncle in a tight situation, forcing him to listen to Govindam. The plan goes awry when Ramadasu, whom Ramalingam told, has his thugs overpower Govindam's assistants and rob Ramalingam themselves.

In the meantime, Govindam has one of his other assistants pose as Rose, a woman whom Raghu married in London, to come and demand money for a divorce, which would force Ramadasu to try and rob Rao's safe for the money and also for the creditors. Anticipating this, Raghu, who had identified Raja and now divulged his knowledge of the plan to him and Manjari, plots to replace the money in Rao's safe with blank paper notes. Both Ramalingam and Bhaja Govindam, as well as Ramadasu and his thugs, converge at Rao's house. Ramalingam tries to leave with the fake money, but is caught and knocked out by the thugs, who are, in turn, knocked out by Raja. Ramadasu is forced to disguise himself as Sarva Baksha Swamy's teacher, Sachitananda Swamy, to avoid detection. Converging in the backyard, Ramalingam is exposed when the fake money is discovered in his bag. Raghu, Raja, Manjari and Govindam all come clean to Rao, and a confused Rao turns to ask Ramadasu, only for him to also reveal himself, and acknowledge that the young people have taught them a very valuable lesson. Ramdasu again accepts Leela as his daughter-in-law, as well as Raja and Manjari's relationship, and Ramalingam also accepts Usha and Govindam's relationship, while a still confused Mukunda Rao, now dressed as an ascetic, looks at the camera and smiles awkwardly.

== Cast ==
- N. T. Rama Rao as Raja Rao
- Savitri as Manjari
- Jamuna as Leela Raghuram
- Jaggayya as Raghuram
- S. V. Ranga Rao as Mukunda Rao
- C.S.R as Ramadasu
- Relangi as Bhaja Govindam
- Ramana Reddy as Ramalingam
- Girija as Usha
- Suryakantham as Rajaratnam
- Mukkamala as Raghu's grandfather
- R. Nageshwara Rao as Ramdin
- Allu Ramalingaiah as Chidambara Shetty
- Kasturi Siva Rao as Takku
- Chadalavada as Chenchalayya
- Balakrishna as Avataram
- Padmanabham as Panakala Rao
- Potti Prasad as a prospective groom

== Production ==
=== Pre-production ===
After the success of Mayabazar (1957), directed by K. V. Reddy, Nagi Reddi and Chakrapani of Vijaya Productions planned to make a contemporary film. Chakrapani came up with an idea about conflict between two older men who are polar opposites: one a debtor evading his creditors, and the other a wealthy gentleman with an inflated sense of prestige. L. V. Prasad was chosen to direct the film; he, Chakrapani and Vempati Sadasivabrahmam developed a script entitled Appu Chesi Pappu Koodu, after a popular Telugu idiom. It was the only film from Vijaya Productions with dialogue written by Sadasivabrahmam.

Film historian Randor Guy opines that Appu Chesi Pappu Koodu was a Telugu remake of Prasad's Tamil film Kadan Vaangi Kalyaanam (1958). Others such as Ashish Rajadhyaksha and Paul Willemen (authors of Encyclopedia of Indian Cinema), film scholar Swarnavel Eswaran Pillai, and M. L. Narasimhan of The Hindu believe that they were filmed simultaneously with different casts for different versions. Thanjai N. Ramaiah Dass wrote the dialogue for Kadan Vaangi Kalyaanam, and M. S. Chalapathi Rao and Jagannadham were the film's executive producers.

=== Casting and filming ===
N. T. Rama Rao and Savitri were chosen for the lead roles, with Jaggayya, C. S. R. Anjaneyulu, S. V. Ranga Rao and Jamuna in supporting roles; Jamuna had no dialogue for most of the film. It was Rama Rao's 55th film as an actor, and Jaggayya's first film for Vijaya Productions. Jaggayya replaced Akkineni Nageswara Rao, who bowed out due to scheduling conflicts. Jaggayya had worked with Prasad as a voice artist for the Telugu-dubbed version of the director's Manohara (1954). Comedian Potti Prasad and Padmanabham made appearances as the prospective bridegrooms of Girija, who played Relangi's fiancée; the former made his Telugu cinema debut with this film. Prasad, who received ₹1,116 for his single scene, praised Nagi Reddi and Chakrapani's generosity. Marcus Bartley was the director of photography. S. Rajeswara Rao composed the soundtrack and background score, assisted by Ogirala Ramachandra Rao and K. Prasada Rao. Ramachandra Rao's son, Narasimhamurthy, was cast as a child artiste. G. Kalyanasundaram and K. Radhakrishna edited the film, and Madhavapeddi Gokhale and Kaladhar were its art directors.

The success of Missamma (1955) encouraged Chakrapani to include a dream sequence, "Damayanti Swayamvaram", in which Rama Rao, Savitri and Jaggayya play Nala, Damayanti and Indra. Rama Rao had to shave his signature moustache for a scene, making Appu Chesi Pappu Koodu the only contemporary film in which he is clean-shaven. Another dance scene, "Aathmathyagam", was filmed by E. V. Saroja and Mikkilineni in Gevacolor; both were choreographed by Pasumarthi Krishnamurthy. Though the film is shown almost entirely in black and white, "Aathmathyagam" alone was filmed in colour. M. Pithambaram and T. P. Bhaktavatsalam provided the make-up. Appu Chesi Pappu Koodu was processed at the Vijaya Laboratory, and was recorded with the Westrex Sound System. The film's final length was 4,934 metres (16,188 ft).

== Music ==
S. Rajeswara Rao composed the soundtrack of Appu Chesi Pappu Koodu. Pingali Nagendrarao wrote the lyrics. Sound mixing was supervised by A. Krishnan and V. Sivaram, processed by N. C. Sen Gupta and orchestrated by A. Krishnamurthy. Ghantasala provided vocals for Rama Rao and Ramaiah, and A. M. Rajah sang for Jaggayya's portions. P. Leela, P. Susheela, and Swarnalatha provided vocals for the actresses. "Echatinundi Veecheno" was based on the Mohana raga. For "Sundarangulanu Choosina Velana" Rajeswara Rao re-used the melody of "Brundavanamadi Andaridi Govindudu Andarivadele", which he wrote for Vijaya Productions' Missamma at Chakrapani's urging (a rare example of the composer recycling an earlier song).

Appu Chesi Pappu Koodu's soundtrack was released in December 1959 on the Saregama label. (Note: iTunes estimates its release date as 1 December 1959, but Gaana estimates the date as 31 December.) "Kaseeki Poyanu Ramahari", "Echatinundi Veecheno", "Moogavaina Emile Nagumome" and "Cheyi Cheyi Kaluparave" became popular over the years; "Cheyi Cheyi Kaluparave" was parodied by the Indian National Congress as part of their election campaign during the 1989 general elections. The poem "Nava Kala Samithi" and other popular songs were played by keyboardist V. Seetharamaiah at the April 2013 Ghantasala Padya Sangeetha Vibhavari event at Kalabharathi Auditorium in Visakhapatnam.

Track listing

All lyrics are written by Pingali Nagendrarao.

No.	Title	Singer(s)	Length
1.	"Appu Chesi Pappu Koodu"	Ghantasala	2:40
2.	"Kalam Kaani Kalamlo"	P. Leela, P. Susheela	3:25
3.	"Rama Rama Saranam"	P. Leela	2:02
4.	"Nava Kala Samithi"	Ghantasala	1:08
5.	"Joharu Gaikonara"	P. Leela	2:52
6.	"Balidaanam"	Ghantasala, P. Susheela	4:33
7.	"Oh Panchavannela Chilaka"	Ghantasala, Swarnalatha	2:53
8.	"Yechati Nundi Veecheno"	Ghantasala, P. Leela	2:41
9.	"Sundarangulanu Choosina Velana"	Ghantasala, A. M. Rajah, P. Leela	3:34
10.	"Moogavaina Yemile"	A. M. Rajah	2:10
11.	"Chitra Naleeyam"	Ghantasala, P. Leela	6:17
12.	"Chinnari Choopulaku"	A M Rajah	2:12
13.	"Anandam Paramanandam"	Ghantasala, P. Leela	2:24
14.	"Cheyi Cheyi Kaluparave"	A. M. Rajah, P. Leela	2:42
15.	"Kaseeki Poyanu Ramahari"	Ghantasala, Swarnalatha	2:54

== Release, reception and legacy ==
Appu Chesi Pappu Koodu was released theatrically on 14 January 1959, during the Makara Sankranti festival season. With mediocre earnings during its first four weeks, the film became an above-average grosser. Its re-release was profitable, and it became a Telugu cult film.

According to M. L. Narasimham of The Hindu, Prasad's "deft handling" made the scenes "flow smoothly" despite the number of characters but the magic of Pelli Chesi Choodu (1952) and Missamma was missing from Appu Chesi Pappu Koodu. In their Encyclopedia of Indian Cinema, Ashish Rajadhyaksha and Paul Willemen wrote that the film "stages the victory of nationalist-modern alliance over decadent feudalism"; Ramaiah's scenes are its "most remarkable sections", giving a "semblance of unity" to a plot they found "barely coherent". K. Moti Gokulsing and Wimal Dissanayake wrote that Appu Chesi Pappu Koodu, Missamma, Gundamma Katha (1962) and Ramudu Bheemudu (1964) "represented the scope comedy had in the 1950s and 60s."

In September 2006, a postage stamp commemorating Prasad was issued in Hyderabad. M. L. Narasimham, in an article about the honour, listed Appu Chesi Pappu Koodu with Shavukaru (1950), Samsaram (1950), Pelli Chesi Choodu, Manohara, Missamma and others as acclaimed films by the director after the release of Mana Desam (1949) and his association with Vijaya Productions. Appu Chesi Pappu Koodu was one of the popular 1950s films featuring Ramana Reddy and Relangi Venkata Ramaiah, whom film historian Punnami Ravi Chandra termed the Laurel and Hardy of Telugu cinema at the time. Relangi Narasimha Rao's 2008 comedy film of the same name, starring Rajendra Prasad, was a commercial failure.

== Digitisation plans ==
In late November 2007, Hyderabad-based Goldstone Technologies acquired the film-negative rights to 14 Telugu films produced by Vijaya Vauhini Studios (including Mayabazar and Appu Chesi Pappu Koodu) to produce digitally-remastered versions in colour. Although the remastered, colourised version of Mayabazar was released in January 2010 and performed well in theatres, Goldstone decided not to remaster the remaining 13 films. According to the company, most of the producers who sold their negative rights to television networks relinquished control of them and the legal ownership and copyright issues proved insurmountable.
