= Chandraharam =

- Theatrical release poster
- Directed by: Kamalakara Kameswara Rao; L. V. Prasad (Supervision)
- Written by: Pingali Nagendra Rao (story / dialogues / songs); Thanjai N. Ramaiah Dass (Tamil)
- Produced by: Nagi Reddy; Chakrapani
- Starring: N. T. Rama Rao; Savitri; Sriranjani
- Cinematography: Marcus Bartley
- Edited by: Jambulingam
- Music by: Ghantasala
- Production company: Vijaya Productions
- Release date: 6 January 1954
- Running time: 174 minutes
- Country: India
- Languages: Telugu; Tamil

Chandraharam is a 1954 Indian swashbuckler film directed by Kamalakara Kameswara Rao in his debut. It was produced by Nagi Reddy-Chakrapani under the Vijaya Productions banner. The film, a Telugu-Tamil bilingual, stars N. T. Rama Rao, Savitri and Sriranjani Jr., with music composed by Ghantasala. It was not commercially successful.

== Cast ==
- N.T. Rama Rao as Prince Chandan
- Savitri as Chanchala
- Sriranjani Jr. as Gauri
- S. V. Ranga Rao as Mali
- Relangi as Dhumaketu
- R. Nageswara Rao
- Padmanabham
- Balakrishna
- K. V. S. Sarma
- Joga Rao
- Suryakantham
- Rushyendramani as Maridamma

== Production ==
The film was produced by Nagi Reddy and Chakrapani under the banner Vijaya Pictures simultaneously in Telugu and Tamil. This is the directorial debut for Kamalakara Kameswara Rao. The cinematography was by Marcus Bartley. Chakrapani wrote the story while Pingali Nagendra Rao wrote the dialogues and lyrics for the Telugu version.

Thanjai N. Ramaiah Dass wrote the dialogues and lyrics for the Tamil version.

== Music ==
=== Telugu songs ===
Music was composed by Ghantasala. Lyrics were written by Pingali Nagendra Rao.

Song title	Singers	Length
"Idi Naa Cheli"	Ghantasala	2:38
"Enchesthe Adhi Ghanakaryam"	Pithapuram	2:34
"Vignana Deepamunu"	Ghantasala	3:30
"Laali Jaya Laali"	N. Lalitha	3:36
"Yemi Siksha Kaavalo"	Ghantasala	2:38
"Ye Saadhuvvlu"	P. Leela	6:03
"Neeku Neeve Thodugaa"	Madhavapeddi Satyam	3:20
"Yevarivo Yechatanundivo"	Ghantasala, A. P. Komala	5:28
"Yevare Yevare"	K. Rani	4:48
"Yenadu Modalidithivo"	Ghantasala	2:43
"Krupa Ganavaa Naa"	P. Leela	3:28
"Jaya Jaya"	Ghantasala	3:19
"Daya Ganave Thalli"	P. Leela	3:14

=== Tamil songs ===
Lyrics by Thanjai N. Ramaiah Dass.

Song	Singers	Lyrics	Length
"Arut Jyothi Devam"	Ghantasala	Ramalinga Swamigal	02:38
"Laali Jaya Laali"	N. Lalitha	Thanjai N. Ramaiah Dass	03:36
"Enadhaaruyir Vanithamani"	Ghantasala	Thanjai N. Ramaiah Dass	3:30
"Enna Sidshai Unakku Vendum"	Ghantasala	Thanjai N. Ramaiah Dass	02:38
"Vidhiye Un Leelai Idhuvo"	Ghantasala	Thanjai N. Ramaiah Dass	02:43
"Arul Purivai Amma"	P. Leela	Thanjai N. Ramaiah Dass	06:03
"Thayavillaiyo En Kurai Kelaayo"	P. Leela	Thanjai N. Ramaiah Dass	
"Jagam Meedhil Alai Modhum"	P. Leela	Thanjai N. Ramaiah Dass	
"Edhu Seidhaal Adhu"	M. Sathyam & Group	Thanjai N. Ramaiah Dass	03:30
"Vaazhivile Kanavu Palikkumo"	Ghantasala & A. P. Komala	Thanjai N. Ramaiah Dass	05:28
"Alaigal Sayanamael"	K. Rani	Thanjai N. Ramaiah Dass	04:48
"Unakku Neeye Thunai Enre"	M. Sathyam	Thanjai N. Ramaiah Dass	03:28
