= Marcus Bartley =

Indian cinematographer (1917–1993)

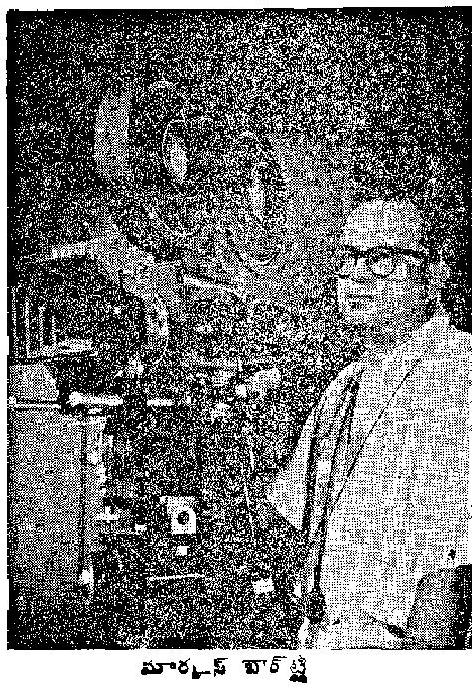
- Born: 22 April 1917; Yercaud, Madras Presidency, British India
- Died: 14 March 1993 (aged 75–76)
- Occupation: Cinematographer

Marcus Bartley (22 April 1917 – 14 March 1993) was an Anglo-Indian cinematographer known for his works predominantly in Telugu cinema along with a few Hindi, Malayalam, and Tamil films. He was the cinematographer of a number of all-time classics like Shavukaru (1950), Pathala Bhairavi (1951), Missamma (1955), Maya Bazaar (1957), Gundamma Katha (1962), Chemmeen (1965), Ram Aur Shyam (1967). He won the National Film Award for Best Cinematography in 1970 for Shanti Nilayam. He also won the Gold Medal at the Cannes Film Festival for Best Cinematography, becoming the first Indian to win the award.

== Early life ==
Marcus Bartley was born into an Anglo-Indian family of renowned doctors in Yercaud, Madras Presidency. While at school, Bartley was an amateur photographer.

== Career ==
In 1940, Bartley headed to Bombay and joined The Times of India as press photographer, and then became a newsreel cameraman for British Movietone under the auspices of The Times of India. Bartley did not have any formal training in photography. He worked hard and learned the craft on the job.

Bartley arrived in Madras and joined Pragati Studios. His maiden film was Swarga Seema in 1945. This film showed his genius at black and white photography. The movie strengthened the friendship between him and the B. N. Reddy, K. V. Reddy, and Nagi Reddi. Successively, Bartley worked in many studios such as National Studios, Newtone Studios and Vauhini Productions.

He wielded camera for all the forty odd Vauhini movies including such great hits as Yogi Vemana (1947), Gunasundari Katha (1949), as well as Vijaya's productions Shavukaru (1950), Pathala Bhairavi (1951), Pelli Chesi Chudu (1952), Chandraharam (1954), Missamma (1955), Maya Bazaar (1957), Appu Chesi Pappu Koodu (1958), Gundamma Katha (1962), Sri Rajeswari Vilas Coffee Club (1976) etc. Most of the superhits of those times were made with his photographic hand at the camera. His specialty was the shots under the moonlight.

Ramu Kariat signed him for the Malayalam film Chemmeen (1965). The film was released in 1965, to universal critical acclaim. The photography by Bartley was highly praised. Bartley didn't receive the National Award that year as portions of the film had to be completed by another cameraman. Cameraman U. Rajagopal who also shot the film later acknowledged that he was only called in to complete patchwork.

== Working style ==
Bartley was known as a perfectionist. He didn’t believe in hierarchies and treated everyone the same. He would work with the screenwriter and director, understanding the screenplay, so he could work on his lighting style. He would work for nights before the commencement of shooting, lighting the set to make it perfect.

== Personal life ==
He spoke fractured Telugu and Tamil and did not understand Hindi. Bartley had long suffered with diabetes, but refused to go to a doctor and treated himself. In the final years of his life, Arriflex made him their authorised service person and Bartley would spend much time repairing lenses. He was shifted to Vijaya Hospital by Nagi Reddi where he was given personal attention.

== Awards ==
- Recipient of the gold medal at the International Film Festival held at Cannes for the movie Chemmeen in Malayalam in the year 1978.
- He won the National Film Award for Best Cinematography in India in 1970 for Shanti Nilayam.
- He also won the Tamil Nadu State Film Award for Best Cinematographer for Shanti Nilayam in 1970.

== Filmography ==
- Zindagi Jeene Ke Liye (1984)
- Maamaankam (1979)
- Yehi Hai Zindagi (1977)
- Sri Rajeswari Vilas Coffee Club (1976)
- Chakravakam (1974)
- Ghar Ghar Ki Kahani (1970)
- Shanti Nilayam (1969)
- Saathi (1968)
- Ram Aur Shyam (1967)
- Chemmeen (1965)
- Gundamma Katha (1962)
- Jagadeka Veeruni Katha (1961)
- Appu Chesi Pappu Koodu (1958)
- Mayabazar (1957)
- Missamma (1955)
- Chandraharam (1954)
- Kalyanam Panni Paar (1952)
- Pelli Chesi Choodu (1952)
- Patala Bhairavi (1951)
- Shavukaru (1950)
- Gunasundari Katha (1949)
- Yogi Vemana (1947)
- Swargaseema (1945)
