= Chakrapani (director) =

Indian writer, producer and director

- Born: Aluri Venkata Subbarao; 5 August 1908; Tenali, Madras Presidency, British India (now Andhra Pradesh, India)
- Died: 24 September 1975 (aged 67); Hyderabad,Andhra Pradesh, India
- Occupations: Film producer; writer; director

Aluri Venkata Subbarao (5 August 1908 – 24 September 1975), popularly known by his pen name Chakrapani, was an Indian screenwriter, film producer, studio owner, and director in Telugu cinema. He received two Filmfare Awards and was notable for his association with Vijaya Vauhini Studios, one of Asia's largest studios at the time. Chakrapani was also a partner at Vijaya Productions alongside B. Nagi Reddi and co-founded Chandamama, the children's magazine.

== Early life ==
Chakrapani was born in Ithanagar village near Tenali, Guntur in present-day Andhra Pradesh, into a Kamma middle-class agricultural family. He initially studied Hindi under the tutelage of the well-known author Vraj Nandan Sharma and later taught himself Tamil, Sanskrit, and English, mastering all three languages.

== Literary career ==
In 1932, Chakrapani contracted tuberculosis and was admitted to the Madanapalle sanatorium for treatment. During his stay, he reportedly learned to read and write Bengali in just three months from a fellow patient. This skill led him to translate many Bengali literary works into Telugu, including Sarat Chandra Chatterji's Devdas, which he translated as Devadasu in 1933. His translations of Bengali novels became immensely popular among Telugu readers.

== Film career ==
Chakrapani's film career took off when he became a close friend of B. Nagi Reddi while working as a writer for Vauhini Productions' Swarga Seema (1945). Well-versed in both Hindi and Bengali, Chakrapani brought a unique literary perspective to Telugu cinema. After joining forces with Nagi Reddi, Chakrapani took on editorial roles for Andhra Jyothi, Yuva, and Chandamama under BNK Press.

When Vijaya Productions was launched, their first film, Shavukaru (1950), was based on a story written by Chakrapani. From then on, all Vijaya Productions films credited Nagi Reddi and Chakrapani as producers, a practice that continued until Chakrapani's demise. Within this partnership, Chakrapani handled story, dialogue, and direction-related matters, while Nagi Reddi focused on production and logistics. Together, they made successful films like Patala Bhairavi, Maya Bazar, Gundamma Katha, Missamma, Shavukaru, and Appu Chesi Pappu Koodu that are still popular with Telugu speaking people. Both made 35 films in Telugu, Tamil, Kannada, Odia and Hindi languages.

== Awards ==
- National Film Award for Best Feature Film in Kannada – Maduve Madinodu (1965)
- Filmfare Best Film Award (Telugu) - Maya Bazaar (1957)
- Filmfare Best Film Award (Telugu) - Gundamma Katha (1962)

== Selected filmography ==
- Dharmapatni (Telugu, 1941) (dialogue) (debut)
- Dharmapatni (Tamil, 1941) (dialogue)
- Swargaseema (1945) (dialogue) (story)
- Shavukaru (1950) (writer)
- Pelli Chesi Choodu (1952) (writer)
- Chandraharam (1954) (writer)
- Guna Sundari (1955) (Producer)
- Missamma (1955) (writer)
- Missiamma (1955) (writer)
- Appu Chesi Pappu Koodu (1958) (adaptation)
- Rechukka Pagatichukka (1959) (screen adaptation)
- Gundamma Katha (1962) (story)
- Manithan Maravillai (1962) (screen adaptation)
- Julie (1975) (screen adaptation)
- Sri Rajeswari Vilas Coffee Club (1976) (writer)
- Swayamvar (1980) (story)

== Producer ==
- Sri Rajeswari Vilas Coffee Club (1976)
- Julie (1975) (Nagi Reddi-Chakrapani)
- Ganga Manga (1973)
- Ram Aur Shyam (1967)
- Maduve Madi Nodu (Kannada) (1965)(Nagi Reddi-Chakrapani)
- Gundamma Katha (1962)
- Manithan Maravillai (1962)
- Appu Chesi Pappu Koodu (1958)
- Maya Bazaar (1957)
- Missamma (1955)
- Chandraharam (1954)
- Pelli Chesi Choodu (1952)
- Patala Bhairavi (1951)
- Shavukaru (1950)

== Director ==
- Sri Rajeswari Vilas Coffee Club (1976)
- Manithan Maravillai (1962)

== Chandamama ==
Both Nagireddy and Aluri came up with the idea of a story book for kids and children, and thus Chandamama was born. The first edition of Chandamama was released in July, 1947. They made Chandamama popular not only in Telugu language but in ten other Indian languages. He started in 1934 the monthly publication of Yuva magazine from Chennai which was later shifted to Hyderabad. Well-known writer Kodavatiganti Kutumba Rao was a partner in this venture. Kodavatiganti Kutumba Rao, a very close friend of aluri and a literary colossus in Telugu Literature, edited it for 28 years, till his death in August 1980.
