= Mayabazar =

1957 film by K. V. Reddy

- Theatrical release poster of the Telugu version
- Directed by: K. V. Reddy
- Screenplay by: K. V. Reddy
- Story by: Pingali Nagendra Rao
- Dialogue by: Pingali Nagendra Rao
- Based on: Sasirekha Parinayam
- Produced by: Nagi Reddi; Chakrapani
- Starring: N. T. Rama Rao; Akkineni Nageswara Rao (Telugu); Gemini Ganesan (Tamil); Savitri; S. V. Ranga Rao
- Cinematography: Marcus Bartley
- Edited by: C. P. Jambulingam; G. Kalyanasundaram
- Music by: Ghantasala
- Production company: Vijaya Productions
- Release date: 27 March 1957
- Running time: 184 minutes (Telugu); 174 minutes (Tamil)
- Country: India
- Languages: Telugu; Tamil

Mayabazar (transl. Market of Illusions) is a 1957 Indian Hindu mythological film directed by K. V. Reddy. The epic was produced by Nagi Reddi and Chakrapani under their banner, Vijaya Productions. Produced by Telugu cinema, it was shot simultaneously in Telugu and Tamil, with a few differences in the cast. The story is an adaptation of the folk tale Sasirekha Parinayam, which is based on the characters of the Sanskrit epic Mahabharata. It revolves around the roles of Krishna (N. T. Rama Rao) and Ghatotkacha (S. V. Ranga Rao), as they try to reunite Arjuna's son Abhimanyu (Telugu: Akkineni Nageswara Rao, Tamil: Gemini Ganesan) with his love, Balarama's daughter Sasirekha (Savitri). The Telugu version features Gummadi, Mukkamala, Ramana Reddy, and Relangi in supporting roles, with D. Balasubramaniam, R. Balasubramaniam, V. M. Ezhumalai, and K. A. Thangavelu playing those respective parts in the Tamil version.

The first mythological film produced by their studio, Mayabazar marked a milestone for Nagi Reddi and Chakrapani. In addition to the technical crew, 400 studio workers – including light men, carpenters, and painters – participated in the development of the film. Director Reddy was meticulous with the pre-production and casting phases, which took nearly a year to complete. Though Rama Rao was initially reluctant to play the lead role, his portrayal of Krishna received acclaim and yielded more offers to reprise the same role in several unrelated films. (Note: Rama Rao reprised the role of Krishna in the Tamil film Karnan (1964), and various unrelated Telugu films such as Vinayaka Chaviti (1957), Sati Anasuya (1957), Deepavali (1960), Sri Krishnarjuna Yuddham (1962), Sri Krishna Pandaveeyam (1966), Sri Krishna Tulabharam (1966), Sri Krishnavataram (1967), Sri Krishna Vijayam (1971), Sri Krishna Satya (1972), Sri Krishnanjaneya Yuddham (1972) and Daana Veera Soora Karna (1977).) The soundtrack features twelve songs, with most of the musical score composed by Ghantasala. Telugu lyrics were written by Pingali Nagendrarao and Tamil lyrics were written by Thanjai N. Ramaiah Dass. One of those songs, Lahiri Lahiri, was accompanied by the first illusion of moonlight in Indian cinema, shot by cinematographer Marcus Bartley.

Mayabazar's Telugu version was released on 27 March 1957; the Tamil version was released two weeks later, on 12 April. Both were critically and commercially successful, with a theatrical run of 100 days in 24 theatres, and it became a silver-jubilee film. The Telugu version of Mayabazar was also dubbed into Kannada. The film is considered a landmark in both Telugu and Tamil cinema, with praise for its cast and technical aspects, despite the limitations of technology at the time. On the centenary of Indian cinema in 2013, CNN-IBN included Mayabazar in its list of "100 greatest Indian films of all time". In an online poll conducted by CNN-IBN among those 100 films, Mayabazar was voted by the public as the "greatest Indian film of all time."

Mayabazar became the first Telugu film to be digitally remastered and colourised, at an estimated cost of ₹7.5 crore (valued at about US$1.7 million in 2010), after Hyderabad-based company Goldstone Technologies acquired world negative rights to fourteen films including that of Mayabazar in late November 2007. The updated version was released on 30 January 2010 in 45 theatres in Andhra Pradesh. It was a commercial success that generated mostly positive reviews, with one critic expressing a preference for the original.

== Plot ==
Subhadra, the sister of Balarama and Krishna, is married to the Pandava prince Arjuna. Their son, Abhimanyu, falls in love with Balarama's daughter, Sasirekha, and the families formally consent to their eventual marriage upon reaching adulthood. Years later, after the children grow up, Krishna reintroduces the two to cement their bond. However, the political landscape shifts when the Pandavas are invited to a rigged game of dice by Duryodhana, the eldest of the Kauravas. Manipulated by Duryodhana's cunning uncle, Shakuni, the Pandavas lose their wealth, kingdom, and liberty. When Duryodhana's brother, Dushasana, attempts to publicly humiliate and disrobe Draupadi, the common wife of the five Pandava brothers, Krishna intervenes to save her dignity.

Upon learning of the Kauravas' behavior, an outraged Balarama travels to their capital, Hastinapuram, to confront them. Exploiting Balarama's naive nature, Shakuni and Duryodhana feign immense respect and swiftly propose a marriage alliance between Sasirekha and Duryodhana's son, Lakshmana Kumara. Their true strategy is to neutralize Balarama and Krishna, forcing them into an alliance should the exiled Pandavas ever wage war. Unaware of the conspiracy, Balarama readily agrees to the proposal.

Due to the Pandavas' sudden poverty, Balarama's status-conscious wife, Revati, refuses to honor the original commitment to Abhimanyu, eagerly backing the affluent Kaurava alliance instead. Krishna subtly instructs his charioteer, Daaruka, to escort Subhadra and Abhimanyu through the wilderness toward the hermitage of Ghatotkacha, Abhimanyu's powerful demon cousin. After a brief initial misunderstanding where he attacks them as intruders, Ghatotkacha learns of the broken marital pact and vows to launch a full-scale war against both the Kauravas and Balarama. Subhadra and his mother, Hidimbi, pacify him, convincing him to use magical deception instead of outright violence.

With the tacit approval of Krishna and the assistance of Sasirekha's loyal servant, Ghatotkacha uses his mystical powers to levitate the sleeping Sasirekha from her chambers in Dvārakā and transports her safely to his hermitage. He then transforms himself into an exact double of Sasirekha and returns to Dvaraka. Supported by his demonic assistants—Chinnamaya, Lambu, and Jambu—the disguised Ghatotkacha begins orchestrating supernatural disruptions to sabotage the impending wedding ceremonies, thoroughly terrifying Lakshmana Kumara.

To completely isolate and manipulate the wedding party, Ghatotkacha constructs an elaborate, illusory palace and marketplace outside Dvaraka, naming the magical town Mayabazar. He invites the Kauravas to lodge there, while his transformed henchmen masquerade as Balarama's handpicked attendants to trick Shakuni’s lackeys, Sarma and Sastry. Operating as the fake Sasirekha, Ghatotkacha relentlessly torments Lakshmana Kumara and manipulates Duryodhana's wife into doubting the union. Simultaneously, he coordinates the wedding of the authentic Sasirekha and Abhimanyu at his wilderness hermitage. Using his divine omnipresence, Krishna attends the real wedding in the forest while concurrently appearing as a guest at the fraudulent celebration in Mayabazar.

On the designated wedding day, the disguised Ghatotkacha continuously frightens and humiliates Lakshmana Kumara during the rituals, while the real Sasirekha successfully weds Abhimanyu in the forest. When an analytical Shakuni uncovers the absolute deception, he aggressively projects the blame onto Krishna. Satyaki, an ardent disciple of Arjuna, challenges Shakuni to speak while standing atop a magical container. Once Shakuni steps onto the box, the magic forces him to involuntarily confess the Kauravas' fraudulent political motives behind the marriage proposal.

His mission accomplished, Ghatotkacha sheds his disguise and reveals his true identity. After thoroughly routing and humiliating the Kaurava contingent, he banishes them back to Hastinapuram. Witnessing the absolute truth, Sasirekha’s parents gracefully accept her marriage to Abhimanyu. They express their deep gratitude to Ghatotkacha, who humbly credits Krishna as the divine mastermind behind the entire operation. As Ghatotkacha sings hymns of devotion, Krishna manifests his cosmic form as Lord Vishnu, leaving the assembled families unified in prayer.

== Cast ==
Cast for both Telugu and Tamil versions

- N. T. Rama Rao as Krishna
- Akkineni Nageswara Rao (Telugu) and Gemini Ganesan (Tamil) as Abhimanyu
- S. V. Ranga Rao as Ghatotkacha
- Savitri as Sasirekha (Telugu), Vatsala (Tamil)
- Relangi (Telugu) and K. A. Thangavelu (Tamil) as Lakshmana Kumara
- Vangara as Shastri
- Allu Ramalingaiah as Sharma
- Valluri Balakrishna as Sarathi (Telugu)
- Gummadi (Telugu) and D. Balasubramaniam (Tamil) as Balarama
- Mukkamala (Telugu) and R. Balasubramaniam (Tamil) as Duryodhana
- C. S. R. Anjaneyulu (Telugu) and M. N. Nambiar (Tamil) as Shakuni
- Rushyendramani as Subhadra
- Sandhya as Rukmini
- Nagabhushanam as Satyaki
- Mikkilineni (Telugu) and V. K. Srinivasan (Tamil) as Karna
- Chhaya Devi (Telugu) and Lakshmi Prabha (Tamil) as Revati
- R. Nageswara Rao (Telugu) and E. R. Sahadevan (Tamil) as Dushasana
- Suryakantham (Telugu) and C. T. Rajakantham (Tamil) as Hidimbi
- Ramana Reddy (Telugu) and V. M. Ezhumalai (Tamil) as Chinnamaya
- Chadalavada as Lambu
- Nalla Ramamurthy as Jambu
- Madhavapeddi Satyam as Daaruka
- Kanchi Narasimha Rao as an old man (Krishna in disguise)
- Boddapati as Sankuteerthulu
- Baby Saraswati as young Sasirekha (Telugu)/Vatsala (Tamil)
- Master Anand as young Abhimanyu
- Rajani as Bhanumati
- Master Babji as young Krishna in a play
- Kakinada Rajaratnam as Yashoda in a play
- Guru Gopinath as Bhasmasura in Mohini Bhasmasura dance drama
- Mukku Raju as Vishnu in Mohini Bhasmasura dance drama

== Production ==
=== Development ===
After the success of Pathala Bhairavi (1951), the production company, Vijaya Productions, selected the film's technical crew for an adaptation of Sasirekha Parinayam (1936), also known as Mayabazar. The eighth adaptation of the folk tale Sasirekha Parinayam, (Note: Other alternative titles for the film included Surekhaapaharan, Veera Ghatotkacha and Vastala Kalyanam.) it was the studio's first mythological film.

K. V. Reddy wrote and directed Mayabazar, assisted by Singeetam Srinivasa Rao, and it was produced by Nagi Reddi and Chakrapani of Vijaya Productions. Nearly a year was spent on pre-production and casting. Pingali Nagendrarao assisted with the story, script, and lyrics. Ghantasala composed the film's score, and Marcus Bartley was the cinematographer. Mayabazar was edited by C. P. Jambulingam and G. Kalyanasundaram; Madhavapeddi Gokhale and Kaladhar were the film's art directors.

=== Casting ===
The film was produced in Telugu and Tamil versions, with a slightly different cast for each. Gemini Ganesan appeared as Abhimanyu in the Tamil version, which was portrayed by Akkineni Nageswara Rao in Telugu. Savitri was retained as the female lead in Tamil also, where her character was named Vatsala instead of Sasirekha. Sachu played the younger version of the character in Tamil. N. T. Rama Rao, hesitant to play Krishna after a negative response to his cameo appearance in Sonta Ooru (1956), agreed at K. V. Reddy's insistence and special care was taken with his costume and body language; Mayabazar was the first of Rama Rao's many appearances as Krishna. According to Rama Rao's widow Lakshmi Parvathi, Nagi Reddy and Chakrapani had initially rejected K. V. Reddy's proposal to cast Rama Rao as Krishna, but he persuaded them into believing that Rama Rao was good for the role. As Rama Rao had a broad chest, K. V. Reddy suggested a slight narrowing to look apt as Krishna. In addition to following other suggestions by K. V. Reddy, Rama Rao read the Mahabharata, the Bhagavata and other Puranas to understand Krishna's character and present it properly. S. V. Ranga Rao, described by Nageswara Rao as the film's male lead in interviews, played the character of Ghatotkacha.

In the Telugu version, Gummadi and Mikkilineni were cast as Balarama and Karna, respectively, whilst Sita had a supporting role as Sasirekha's maid. Relangi portrayed Lakshmana Kumara, Duryodhana's son; his popularity inspired a song with him and Savitri. Allu Rama Lingaiah and Vangara Venkata Subbaiah enacted the parts of Shakuni's lackeys, Sarma and Sastry. Kanchi Narasimha Rao played Krishna, disguised as an old man who stops Ghatotkacha when he enters Dwaraka. The playback singer Madhavapeddi Satyam made a cameo appearance as Daaruka, singing "Bhali Bhali Bhali Deva". Ramana Reddy portrayed Chinnamayya, a tantrik who teaches witchcraft at Ghatotkacha's ashram, with Chadalavada and Nalla Ramamurthy playing his apprentices Lambu and Jambu. Nagabhushanam played Satyaki. Valluri Balakrishna was cast as Sarathi, and appeared only in the Telugu version of the film.

=== Filming ===
During rehearsals, K. V. Reddy timed his actors with a stopwatch, calculating the length of each scene (including songs) to determine the film's length. D. S. Ambu Rao, Bartley's assistant, said that Mayabazar was shot according to the screenplay and Bartley's lighting. The song "Lahiri Lahiri" was shot at Adyar River, Chennai. Its outdoor filming lasted for 10 to 15 seconds. Bartley then created an illusion of moonlight, which according to Ambu Rao was a first for an Indian film. Nageswara Rao was injured on the film's set, and action sequences featuring himself and Ranga Rao were shot only after his recovery, causing a three-month delay in the release of the film. Ganesan volunteered to act as Nageswara Rao's body double in a scene where Abhimanyu would jump from a second-floor balcony.

In addition to the principal technicians and actors, a crew of 400, including light men, carpenters, and painters, worked on Mayabazar during production. For the Dvaraka set, 300 unique miniature houses were created in an approximately 50-by-60-foot (15 m × 18 m) electrified space at Vauhini Studios under the supervision of Madhavapeddi Gokhale and Kaladhar. The desired effect in the "laddoo gobbling" shots of Ghatotkacha in the song "Vivaha Bhojanambu" took four days to film. (Note: Laddu, alternatively spelt as Laddoo, is a ball-shaped confection made of flour, ghee and jaggery/sugar. It is typically found on the Indian subcontinent.) The entire song was filmed using stop motion animation. In the scene where Ghatotkacha (disguised as Sasirekha) stamps Lakshmana Kumara's foot with his own, the expression is Savitri's; the stamping foot belongs to choreographer Pasumarthy Krishnamurthy, who pasted false hair on his foot to make it appear demonic.

== Music ==
After writing the music for four songs – "Srikarulu Devathalu", "Lahiri Lahiri", "Choopulu Kalasina Subhavela" and "Neekosame" – S. Rajeswara Rao left the project. (Note: M. L. Narasimham does not mention why S. Rajeswara Rao opted out of the project.) Following his departure, Ghantasala orchestrated and recorded Rajeswara Rao's compositions with N. C. Sen Gupta and A. Krishnamurthy, and composed the rest of the film's score.

The soundtrack album has 12 songs with lyrics by Pingali Nagendrarao and Thanjai N. Ramaiah Dass for the Telugu and Tamil versions, respectively, and was mixed by A. Krishnan and Siva Ram. The album was engineered by N. C. Sen Gupta and orchestrated by A. Krishnamurthy. P. Leela said in an interview that one of her songs took 28 takes to record, and her fifth song was finished by Ghantasala. "Lahiri Lahiri" ("Aaga Inba Nilavinile" in Tamil) was based on the Mohanam raga.

"Vivaha Bhojanambu" ("Kalyana Samayal Saadham" in Tamil) was heavily based on lyrics from Surabhi Nataka Samajam's 1950s plays, which were influenced by 1940s Janaki Sapadham harikatha records by B. Nagarajakumari. Nagarajakumari was inspired by a song composed by Gali Penchala Narasimha Rao for Sasirekha Parinayam (1936), directed by P. V. Das. That song's melody was inspired by Charles Penrose's 1922 song "The Laughing Policeman", written by Penrose under the pseudonym of Charles Jolly.

According to M. L. Narasimham of The Hindu, music "flowed at its mellifluous best" in Mayabazar. He added that Ghantasala "gave a new lease of life" to the song "Vivaha Bhojanambu", despite it being a borrowed tune.

== Release ==
The Telugu version of Mayabazar was released on 27 March 1957, and the Tamil version two weeks later on 12 April. Both versions have a film-reel length of 5,888 metres (19,318 ft). A commercial success, Mayabazar had a theatrical run of 100 days in 24 theatres and went on to become a silver jubilee film. (Note: A Silver Jubilee film is one that completes a theatrical run of 175 days (25 weeks).) After the film's release, 40,000 colour calendars of Rama Rao as Krishna were distributed to the public. The Telugu version of Mayabazar was dubbed into Kannada with the same name in 1965; it remained the last Indian film to be dubbed into Kannada until the announcement of a dubbed version of Kochadaiiyaan (2014) after 50 years.

Dasari Narayana Rao remade the film later with the same title. Mayabazar was shown at the Public Gardens in Hyderabad on 7 April 2007 for the film's 50th anniversary, at a celebration organised by the Andhra Pradesh Department of Culture, the Film, TV and Theatre Development Corporation and Kinnera Art Theatres. Nageswara Rao and C. Narayana Reddy, who were associated with the film, were honoured on the occasion. The former released a book written by Raavi Kondala Rao at Lalitha Kala Thoranam located in the Public Gardens. Kondala Rao novelised the film's script based on K. V. Reddy's screenplay.

== Critical reception ==
The film received positive reviews from critics, particularly for the work of its technical crew. In 2006, W. Chandrakanth of The Hindu wrote:

The greatness of the director lies here – he successfully reduces all characters to ordinary mortals displaying all the follies of human beings except Ghatothkacha or Krishna. And then he injects into the Yadava household a Telugu atmosphere, full with its simile, imagery, adage, sarcasm and wit. The result – a feast for the eyes and soul. That is Mayabazar for you.

Vijaysree Venkatraman wrote for The Hindu in 2008 that the "special effects in this summer's Hollywood superhero movies were spectacular, but, for me, the mythological Maya Bazaar [sic] hasn't lost any of its magic", adding, "If watching the genial half-demon polish off a wedding feast single-handedly remains a treat, seeing the greedy duo from the groom's side get whacked alternately by the furniture and the wilful carpet has me in splits". The Hindu film critic M. L. Narasimham wrote: "Though there were several movie versions in various Indian languages, the 1957 Vijaya Productions' Mayabazar is still considered the best for its all round excellence". According to The Times of India, "With a powerful cast and a strong script, this movie is a stealer. Savitri, NTR [N. T. Rama Rao], ANR [Akkineni Nageswara Rao], SV Rangarao and not to mention Suryakantam add layers to their characters. Of course, the language and the dialogues, simply unbeatable. Some of the scenes are simply hilarious."

In his 2013 book Bollywood Nation: India through Its Cinema, Vamsee Juluri wrote, "Maya Bazar's appeal is of course as much in its story as in its stars. But the performances and the beautiful songs and sets aside, the film also reveals an interesting feature of the Telugu mythological in its Golden Age—it is a story about something not very important from a doctrinal view of religion at all". Juluri also termed Ranga Rao's performance as "mighty and majestic". In April 2013, News18 referred to Mayabazar as a "pioneer in every sense". They praised its cinematography and music, adding that Rama Rao "proved his calibre as a method actor". In their 2015 book, Transcultural Negotiations of Gender: Studies in (Be)longing, Saugata Bhaduri and Indrani Mukherjee opined that Mayabazar "both breaks and perpetuates the stereotypes for masculine and feminine bhavas by making a single female actor Savitri perform both the set of emotions".

== Colourisation ==
A still from the song "Vivaha Bhojanambu" ("Kalyana Samayal Saadham" in Tamil) in the digitally-remastered, coloured version; Mohan said this song was one of the most challenging sequences, since he wanted the food to look more realistic after colourisation.

Vijaya Productions was not keen on selling just Mayabazar. The rates of all their other films put together worked out to just 10–15 per cent more than what I had to pay for Mayabazar. I purchased the entire lot.

— C. Jagan Mohan of Goldstone Technologies

Mayabazar was the first colourised Telugu film, with its audio remastered from monaural to a DTS 5.1-channel system. In late November 2007 a Hyderabad company, Goldstone Technologies, acquired world negative rights to 14 Telugu films produced by Vijaya Vauhini Studios, including that of Mayabazar, to digitally remaster them in colour. C. Jagan Mohan of Goldstone Technologies' experience at All India Radio gave him the idea of converting the film's audio to DTS. The audio was restored, sound effects remastered, distortion eliminated, and the volume of the vocals increased, and musicians re-recorded the film's background music on seven tracks instead of one.

A team of 165 people worked for eight months; Mohan used 180,000 shades of colour to create a tone similar to human skin, and employed 16.7-million-shade colour technology. Apart from colouring clothing and jewellery, Mohan said that the song "Vivaha Bhojanambu" and the wedding scene in the climax were the most challenging sequences, and that the food should look more realistic after colourisation. In the wedding scene, Mohan explained: "Each and every rose petal strewn on the pathway had to be coloured. Further, each frame in the climax has many actors. In technical parlance, we refer to a set of colours used for skin tone, clothes, jewelry and so on as different masks. If five or six masks were used on one character, the presence of many actors in a frame called for that much more work." Three songs ("Bhali Bhali Deva", "Vinnavamma Yashodha" and "Choopulu Kalisina Subha Vela") and many poems were cut from the remastered colour version to maintain print quality.

== Re-release ==
With an estimated digitalisation budget of ₹7.5 crore (valued at about US$1.7 million in 2010), (Note: The exchange rate in 2010 was 45.09 Indian rupees (₹) per 1 US dollar (US$).) Mayabazar was released in colour on 30 January 2010 in 45 Andhra Pradesh theatres. The colourised version was distributed by R. B. Choudary under his production banner, Super Good Films. Nageswara Rao, Gummadi Venkateswara Rao, Mikkilineni Radhakrishna Murthy and Sita were the only cast members still alive for the release of the digitally remastered version. The colour version received positive reviews and was commercially successful. M. L. Narasimham of The Hindu called the new version "laudable, but the soul was missing", adding, "Get a DVD of the original (Black & White) movie, watch it and you will agree with ANR [Akkineni Nageswara Rao] who while talking about Mayabazar once exclaimed, 'What a picture it was!'".

According to a 29 January 2010 government order, the remastered version was exempted from entertainment tax, although theatre owners charged full price because they and other film producers were uncertain of the order's validity. Despite Mayabazar's success, Mohan decided not to remaster the remaining 14 films; according to him, most producers who sold negative rights to TV channels lost control of them, and he cited legal and copyright issues.

The Film Heritage Foundation announced in March 2015 that they would be restoring Mayabazar, along with a few other Indian films from 1931 to 1965, as a part of their restoration projects carried out in India and abroad in accordance with international parameters. The foundation opposed digital colourisation, stating that they "believe in the original repair as the way the master or the creator had seen it".

== Legacy ==
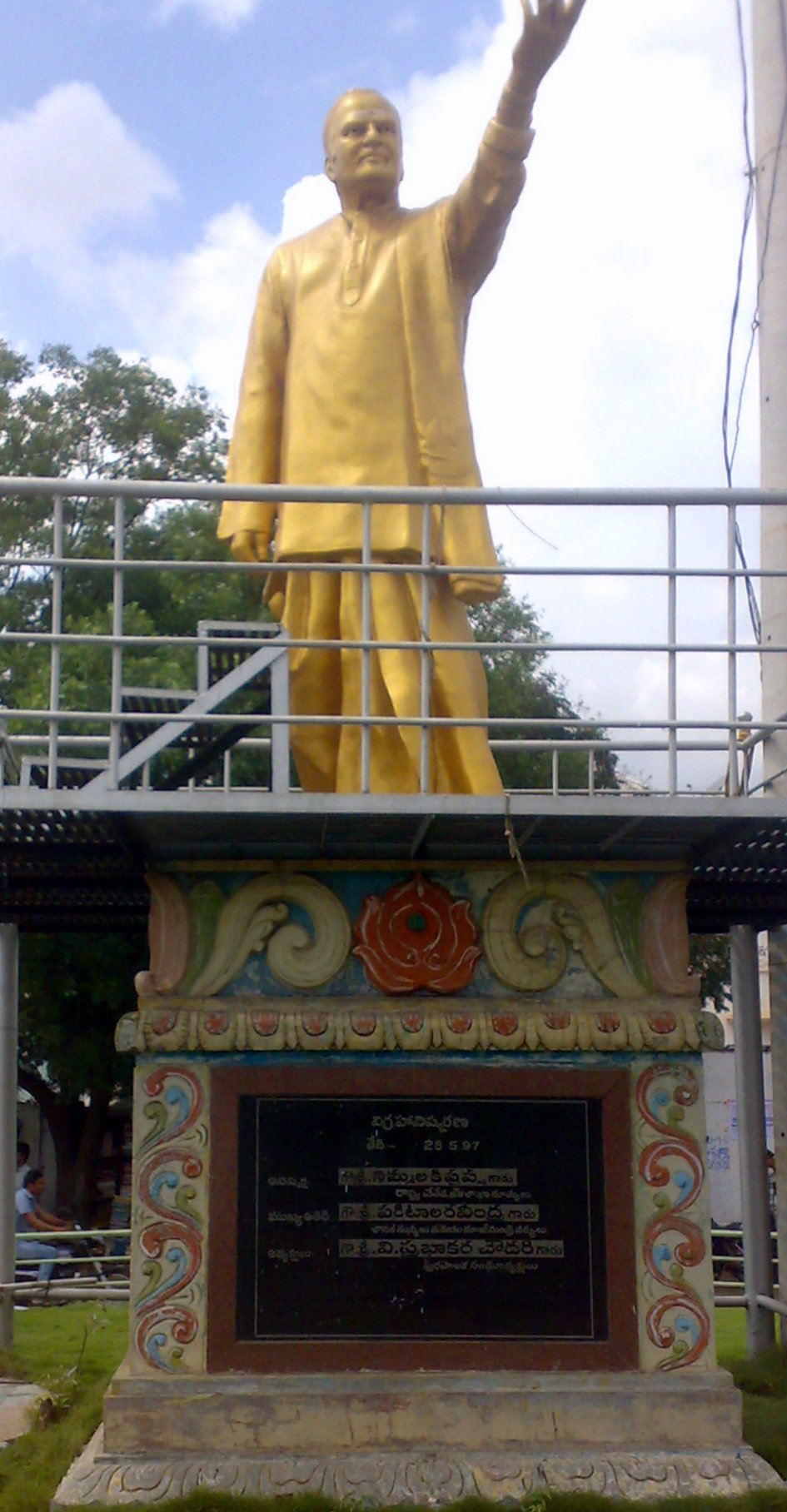
Mayabazar's success made N. T. Rama Rao (statue pictured) reprise the role of Krishna in many Telugu films.

Mayabazar is considered a classic of Telugu cinema, particularly in its use of technology. The film is memorable for Nagendra Rao's dialogue: "Evaru puttinchakunte maatalela pudathayi" ("How would words emerge if no one invented them?") and "Subhadra, aagadalu, aghaaityalu naaku paniki raavu" ("Subhadra, these atrocities mean nothing to me."). Various words and phrases, such as "antha alamalame kada" ("Is everything fine?"), "Asamadiyulu" ("Friends"), "Tasamadiyulu" ("Enemies"), "Gilpam" and "Gimbali" ("bed-" and "room-mat"), later became part of Telugu vernacular. The success of Donga Ramudu (1955) and Mayabazar prompted K. V. Reddy to produce the 1958 Telugu film Pellinaati Pramanalu (Vazhkai Oppantham in Tamil). It recovered its investment and won the silver medal at the annual National Film Awards.

A 1987 Telugu film directed by Jandhyala and a 2011 Telugu film directed by Veerabhadram Chowdary were named after the song "Aha Naa Pellanta" from the film; both were successful. Jandhyala named his 1988 Telugu films Vivaha Bhojanambu and Choopulu Kalasina Subhavela after the songs of the same name. Telugu comedian Mallikarjuna Rao considered Mayabazar to be the "greatest comedy film ever", adding that it represents "one of the most transcendental and joyful experiences any movie-lover can hope for". Telugu director Mohan Krishna Indraganti named his second film Mayabazar (2006, also a fantasy film). Regarding his title, Indraganti said he was a fan of Mayabazar and named his film (produced by B. Satyanarayana) at the insistence of writer D. V. Narasaraju.

In January 2007, M. L. Narasimham of The Hindu listed Mayabazar with Mala Pilla (1938), Raithu Bidda (1939), Vara Vikrayam (1939), Bhakta Potana (1942), Shavukaru (1950), Malliswari (1951) Peddamanushulu (1954) and Lava Kusa (1963) as films that have influenced society and Telugu cinema. Rama Rao reprised the role of Krishna in several films over a two-decade career.

Singeetam Srinivasa Rao used Mayabazar's storyline in his 2008 multilingual animation film Ghatothkach. Director Krishna Vamsi called Mayabazar more an "epic, than a mere classic" and said that the film's tagline, "Sasirekha Parinayam", inspired the title of his 2009 Telugu film. In February 2010, acting coach and director L. Satyanand compared Mayabazar to films such as The Ten Commandments (1956), Ben-Hur (1959), Sholay (1975) and Avatar (2009), saying that they "are evergreen and never fade away from the mind", with continued appeal. Satyanand praised Bartley's cinematography, saying that the film

... was definitely ahead of its time. It is still a mystery how Marcus Bartley could morph Sasirekha through the ripples in the pond. It was an absolute masterpiece, considering the equipment in use, those days. In the absence of hi-def cameras, computer generated visual effects and high-end computers, the direction, cinematography and visual effects were efforts of sheer human genius.

In the period drama Rajanna (2011), the central character Mallamma (played by Baby Annie) listens to Mayabazar's songs. Although this was criticised as anachronistic, director V. Vijayendra Prasad said that Rajanna was set in 1958, a year after Mayabazar's release. In Ram Gopal Varma's Katha Screenplay Darsakatvam Appalaraju (2011), its protagonist Appalaraju (played by Sunil), an aspiring director, is shown enjoying a sequence from the song "Lahiri Lahiri" in the song "Mayabazaaru". In her article "The making of Tollywood", commemorating the 81st anniversary of the Indian Telugu film industry, Sunita Raghu of The New Indian Express called Mayabazar the "tour de force" of Telugu cinema. In November 2012, The Times of India listed Mayabazar along with other unrelated films such as Missamma (1955), Gundamma Katha (1962), Nartanasala (1963), and Bommarillu (2006) in the list "Telugu classics to watch along with family this Deepavali". On the centenary of Indian cinema in 2013, CNN-IBN included Mayabazar in its list of "100 greatest Indian films of all time". In an online poll conducted among the aforementioned 100 films, Mayabazar was voted by the public as the "greatest Indian film ever." In commemoration of the centennial of Indian cinema, The Hindu listed Mayabazar along with Pathala Bhairavi (1951), Missamma, Gundamma Katha, Maduve Madi Nodu (1965), Ram Aur Shyam (1967), Julie (1975), and Shriman Shrimati (1982) as the iconic films produced by Nagi Reddy.

I was 7-8 years old when I first saw it [Mayabazaar] as a kid, I loved it immensely. Later, when I came to the film industry, I kept thinking about how KV Reddy and his team made the film back in those days. I was mesmerised by the visual effects in that film. Later, while making Yamadonga, my VFX supervisor and I spent two days just to figure out how KV Reddy had pulled off such amazing special effects back then. The more I explored the world of Mayabazaar, my respect for KV Reddy kept growing.

— S. S. Rajamouli about Mayabazar.

News18 included Mayabazar on its February 2014 list of "12 Indian films that would make great books", and in May 2014 Rediff included the film on its list of "The Best Mythological Films of Tamil Cinema". The Tamil film Kalyana Samayal Saadham (2013) was named after the song of the same name. The Andhra Pradesh state government planned to introduce the film as part of the tenth standard English syllabus in 2014. The fourth unit of the English textbook, "Films and Theatres", mentions Mayabazar and its actors and has two stills from the film. In March 2012, film historian Mohan Raman stated in an interview with The Times of India that Mayabazar, which "perfected the art of trick photography", was "among the significant black and white films of yore", along with Andha Naal (1954) and Uthama Puthiran (1940).

The scene in which Krishna reveals his identity to Ghatotkacha at Dvaraka was used in Gopala Gopala (2015), with Pawan Kalyan as Krishna. References were made to Shakuni's character in the film Pataas (2015) starring Rama Rao's grandson Nandamuri Kalyan Ram. Director S. S. Rajamouli told film critic Subhash K. Jha that K. V. Reddy's work in Mayabazar was a "huge inspiration" for him to make Baahubali: The Beginning (2015) and Baahubali: The Conclusion. Writing for DailyO, an online opinion platform from the India Today Group, actor Rana Daggubati opined that films like Mayabazar were "truly cutting edge" and added, "Considering the technological limitations technicians were working with back then, these were phenomenally commendable instances of the Indian cinema". In an interview with The Hindu in November 2015, actor Kamal Haasan noted, "Visual appeal has always gone hand-in-hand with content, since the days of Chandralekha and Maya Bazaar [sic], not just after Baahubali." A 90-minute theatrical adaptation of the film was staged in December 2016 by Bangalore Little Theatre.

== Bibliography ==
- Bhaduri, Saugata; Mukherjee, Indrani (2015). Transcultural Negotiations of Gender: Studies in (Be)longing. New Delhi: Springer India. ISBN 978-81-322-2437-2. OCLC 921887749.
- Juluri, Vamsee (2013). Bollywood Nation: India through Its Cinema. New Delhi: Penguin Books India. ISBN 978-0-14-306511-1. OCLC 881560324.
- Pattanaik, Devdutt (2010). Jaya: An Illustrated Retelling of the Mahabharata. New Delhi: Penguin Books India. ISBN 978-0-14-310425-4.
- Prakāśam, Vennelaṇṭi (1 January 1999). Semiotics of Language, Literature, and Culture. Allied Publishers. ISBN 978-81-7023-942-0.
- Rajadhyaksha, Ashish; Willemen, Paul (2014) [1999]. Encyclopaedia of Indian Cinema (eBook) (2nd ed.). Hoboken, New Jersey: Routledge. ISBN 978-1-57958-146-6. OCLC 884014660.
- Lyden, John (2009). The Routledge Companion to Religion and Film. London: Routledge. ISBN 978-0-415-60187-0. OCLC 237881008.
