= B. Nagi Reddi =

Indian film director (1912–2004)

Nagi Reddi
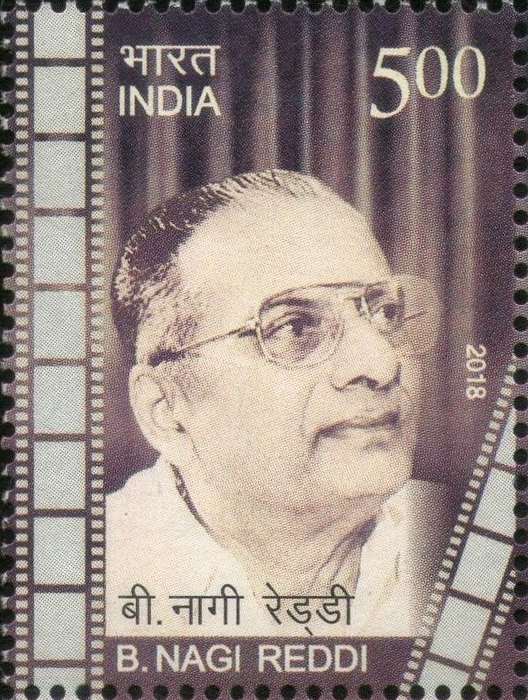
- Reddy on a 2018 stamp of India
- Born: Bommireddy Nagi Reddy; 2 December 1912; Pottipadu, Kadapa district, Madras Presidency, British India (present-day Andhra Pradesh, India)
- Died: 25 February 2004 (aged 91); Chennai, Tamil Nadu, India
- Occupations: Film producer; editor; director
- Years active: 1950–89
- Awards: Dadasaheb Phalke Award (1986)

Bommireddy Nagi Reddi (2 December 1912 – 25 February 2004) was an Indian film producer primarily associated with Telugu cinema, along with notable contributions to Tamil and Hindi films. He co-founded Vijaya Vauhini Studios in Madras, which was once the largest film studio in Asia by floor space. To distinguish him from his elder brother, filmmaker B. N. Reddi, he was popularly known as B. Nagi Reddi.

Over his career, Nagi Reddi produced several acclaimed films, including Patala Bhairavi (1951), Missamma (1955), Mayabazar (1957), Gundamma Katha (1962), Enga Veetu Pillai (1965), and Nam Naadu (1969). He also produced Hindi films such as Ram Aur Shyam (1967), Julie (1975), and Swarg Narak (1978). His work spanned multiple languages and genres, earning him recognition across Indian cinema.

Nagi Reddi served as the president of the Film Federation of India twice, during 1960–61 and 1962–63.

== Personal life ==
B. Nagi Reddi was born in a Telugu family in Pottipadu, a village in the Kadapa district of Andhra Pradesh, and was raised by his maternal grandparents during the first 14 years of his life.

He was married and had four sons and two daughters. One of his sons, B. Venkatarama Reddi, was a film producer. Another son, B. Viswanatha Reddi, was the publisher of Chandamama.

== Film career ==
Nagi Reddi along with his friend and partner Aluri Chakrapani produced over fifty films in four decades in the four South Indian languages and also in Hindi. He made mythological, devotional, and historical Telugu movies. Some of his more notable films include Pathala Bhairavi, Maya Bazaar, and Missamma. He made most of his films in association with screenwriter Chakrapani. Nagi Reddi closed down Vijaya-Vahini after the Telugu film industry moved out of studios in the 1970s, and started the Vijaya Hospital and Vijaya Health Centre.

A new award was incorporated, commemorating his 100th birth year, the Nagi Reddi, memorial Award for the best Telugu and Tamil family entertainers.

== Awards ==
National Film Awards

- Dada Saheb Phalke Award – 1986.
- National Film Award for Best Feature Film in Kannada – Maduve Madinodu (1965)

Filmfare Awards

- Filmfare Best Film Award (Telugu) – Mayabazar (1957)
- Filmfare Best Film Award (Telugu) – Gundamma Katha (1962)

Nandi Awards

- The Government of Andhra Pradesh awarded him the Raghupathi Venkaiah Award in 1987.

Tamil Nadu State Awards

- The Government of Tamil Nadu awarded him the Kalaimamani Award in 1972.

Other Honours

- He was awarded an honorary doctorate by Srikrishnadevaraya University and Sri Venkateswara University.
- A commemorative postage stamp was issued by India Post on 23 February 2018.

== Other businesses and philanthropy ==
Nagi Reddi served as chairman of the board of Trustees of Tirumala Tirupati Devasthanams between 1980 and 1983, and is credited for building the Vaikuntam Queue Complex that now serves to regulate pilgrims for darshan in the Tirumala Venkateswara Temple. Nagi Reddi founded the Vijaya Medical & Educational Trust in 1972. The trust runs the Vijaya Hospital (1972), Vijaya Health Center (1987) and Vijaya Heart Foundation (1996). Nagi Reddi headed the South Indian Film Chamber of Commerce four times and the All-India Film Sammelan for two terms.

He established the children's magazine Chandamama in July 1947. The magazine was eventually printed in nearly a dozen different languages.

He was the founder of Vijaya Hospitals in Vadapalani, Chennai.

== Filmography ==
=== As producer ===
- Shavukaru (1950) (producer)
- Patala Bhairavi (1951) (producer)
- Pelli Chesi Choodu (1952) (producer)
- Chandraharam (1954) (producer)
- Guna Sundari (1955) (producer as B. Nagi Reddi)
- Missiamma (1955) (producer)
- Missamma (1955) (producer)
- Maya Bazaar (1957/II) (producer)
- Maya Bazaar (1957/I) (producer)
- Appu Chesi Pappu Koodu (1958) (producer)
- Paigham (1959) (Producer)
- Manithan Maravillai (1962) (producer)
- Gundamma Katha (1962) (producer)
- Enga Veettu Pillai (1965) (producer) (as B.Naggi Reddi)
- Ram Aur Shyam (1967) (producer) (as B. Nagi Reddi)
- Nam Naadu (1969) (producer) (as B. Nagi Reddi)
- Ghar Ghar Ki Kahani (1970) (producer) (as B. Nagi Reddi)
- Ganga Manga (1973) (producer)
- Julie (1975) (producer) (as B. Nagi Reddi-Chakrapani)
- Sri Rajeswari Vilas Coffee Club (1976) (producer)
- Yehi Hai Zindagi (1977) (producer) (as B. Nagi Reddi)
- Swarg Narak (1978) (producer) (as B. Nagi Reddi)
- Swayamvar (1980) (producer) (as B. Nagi Reddi)
- Shriman Shrimati (1982) (producer) (as B. Nagi Reddi)
- Meendum Savithri (1996) (producer) (as B. Nagi Reddi)
- Neti Savithri (1996) (producer) (as B. Nagi Reddi)

=== As Presenter ===
- Shriman Shrimati (1982) (presenter) (as B. Nagi Reddi)
- Swayamvar (1980) (presenter) (as B. Nagi Reddi)
- Swarg Narak (1978) (presenter) (as B. Nagi Reddi)
- Yehi Hai Zindagi (1977) (presenter) (as B. Nagi Reddi) a.k.a. Yehi Hai Zindagi (India: Hindi title: video box title)
- Julie (1975) (presenter) (as B. Nagi Reddi)
- Prem Nagar (1974) (presenter) (as B. Nagi Reddi)
- Ram Aur Shyam (1967) (presenter) (as B. Nagi Reddi)

=== In Editorial Department ===
- Hai Hai Nayaka (1989) (assistant editor)

=== As director ===
- Enga Veetu Penn (1966)

=== Thankful ===
- Ram Tere Kitne Nam (1985) (sincere thanks) (as Shri Nagi Reddi)

== See also ==
- Raghupathi Venkaiah Award
