= Ram Aur Shyam =

- Ram Aur Shyam poster
- Directed by: Tapi Chanakya
- Written by: Kaushal Bharati; Narasa Raju D. V.
- Story by: Narasa Raju D. V.
- Based on: Ramudu Bheemudu (Telugu) by D. V. Narasa Raju
- Produced by: Chakrapani; B. Nagi Reddy
- Starring: Dilip Kumar; Waheeda Rehman; Mumtaz
- Cinematography: Marcus Bartley
- Edited by: C. P. Jambulingam
- Music by: Naushad
- Production company: Vijaya Productions
- Distributed by: Vijaya Productions
- Release date: 1967
- Running time: 171 min.
- Country: India
- Language: Hindi

Ram Aur Shyam (English: Ram And Shyam) is a 1967 Indian Hindi-language comedy-drama film directed by Tapi Chanakya. The film is a remake of Chanakya's 1964 Telugu film Ramudu Bheemudu. It stars Dilip Kumar in a dual roles of identical twin brothers, alongside Waheeda Rehman, Mumtaz, Nirupa Roy, Pran. The music was composed by Naushad, with lyrics written by Shakeel Badayuni.

Ram Aur Shyam was the second highest-grossing Indian film of 1967, domestically in India and overseas. It was listed at number 15 in the "Top 50 Film of Last 50 years" list compiled by Box Office India magazine in 2011 which featured all-time highest-grossing Bollywood films by using gold-price inflation. The film received 3 nominations at the 15th Filmfare Awards, including Best Actress for Waheeda Rehman and Best Supporting Actress for Mumtaz and won Best Actor for Dilip Kumar.

== Plot ==
Ram lives with his sister Sulakshana and niece Kuku on his family estate. His brother-in-law Gajendra is a Ghar Jamai who looks after his factories and controls his property with an iron grip. Ram is shy and cowardly in nature and so he is always verbally abused and brutally beaten by Gajendra. Sulakshana and Kuku try to protect Ram from Gajendra whenever he whips Ram and decide to get Ram married for his well being.

Gajendra finds a rich girl Anjana with the aim of getting a huge dowry. Anjana dislikes Ram after he spills tea over her due to nervousness. Gajendra, angry at Ram's behaviour, conspires with his mother and cunning Munimji to kill Ram and take over his property. Ram overhears this and escapes to the city to save his life. Meanwhile, Ram's long lost identical twin brother Shyam lives in a village with his adopted mother Ganga, whom he believes to be his biological mother. No one other than Ganga knows the truth about the twin brothers.

Shyam is strong, brave and mischievous, unlike his brother. He has a love-hate relationship with Shanta. Shyam escapes to the city, after a mischievous conflict with Ganga, and meets Anjana, who is impressed by his personality. Anjana and her father mistake Shyam for Ram. Ram meets Shanta, who thinks he is Shyam and takes him forcefully to his mother. Ram and Shanta develop feelings for each other. Meanwhile, Shyam decides to take the place of Ram to face Gajendra.

Shyam refuses to sign his property over, after which an angry Gajendra attacks him. Shyam retaliates and whips Gajendra hard, shocking everybody. Sulakshana stops her brother to protect her husband. Gajendra is startled after being beaten up by Shyam, whom everybody believes as Ram. Shanta and Anjana meet and both claim the picture of Ram as their fiancé. Gajendra learns that Shyam has taken the place of Ram. He abducts Ram and Shanta, and plans to kill Ram. He frames Shyam for the murder of Ram though Ram is alive. Shyam is arrested by police. Anjana and her father learn from Ganga that Ram and Shyam are twin brothers lost in a village fair.

They also learn about the true colours of Gajendra. Shyam escapes from police custody and battles Gajendra and his henchmen. Gajendra tries to shoot the twins but both brothers and Shanta manage to defeat him. At the end, the twin brothers are happily married and the family reunited.

== Cast ==
- Dilip Kumar as Ram / Shyam (Double Role)
- Waheeda Rehman as Anjana
- Mumtaz as Shanta
- Nirupa Roy as Sulakshana
- Pran as Gajendra
- Nazir Hussain as Rai Sahib Gangadhar
- Kanhaiyalal as Munimji
- Mukri as Gopal
- Sajjan as Police Inspector
- Raj Kishore as Restaurant Waiter
- Baby Farida as Kuku
- Laxmi Chhaya as Dancer
- Leela Mishra as Ganga
- Zebunissa as Gajendra's Mother

== Reception ==
Dilip Kumar, who was known as "Tragedy-King" surprised the audience with his comic performance, which won him Best Actor at the 15th Filmfare Awards.

=== Box-Office ===
At the domestic Indian box office, Ram Aur Shyam grossed ₹27.5 million ($3.7 million) nett. Adjusted for inflation, the film's domestic nett gross is equivalent to $36 million (₹1.84 billion) in 2016. It was 1967's second highest-grossing film in India, after Upkar.

Overseas at the Soviet box office, Ram Aur Shyam was released with 1,160 prints and sold 33.4 million tickets in 1972. At the average Soviet ticket price of 25 kopecks at the time, the film grossed 8.35 million Rbls ($10.1 million), ₹76.8 million). Adjusted for inflation, the film's overseas Soviet gross is equivalent to $78 million (₹3.96 billion) in 2016. It was the second highest-grossing 1967 Indian film in the Soviet Union, after Hamraaz.

Worldwide, the film grossed ₹104.3 million ($13.8 million) by 1972. Adjusted for inflation, its worldwide gross is equivalent to ₹5.8 billion ($85 million) in 2016.

== Legacy ==
Dilip Kumar stated in an interview "The script of Ram Aur Shyam (1967) offered me endless stimulation. Each scene was sharply written to highlight the contrast between the characters and their predicaments."

According to Rediff.com, the most famous twin act in India, remains to be Dilip Kumar's turn in Ram Aur Shyam. The film is also included in their list of "Landmark Film of 60s".

== Soundtrack ==
Ram Aur Shyam

Soundtrack album by Naushad
- Released: 1967
- Genre: Feature Film Soundtrack
- Labels: His Master's Voice, Saregama
- Producer: Naushad

Lyrics were written by Shakeel Badayuni. Vocals were supplied by Mohd. Rafi & Mahendra Kapoor for Kumar, with Lata Mangeshkar for Rehman, and Asha Bhosle for Mumtaz.

Song	Singer	Raga
"Maine Kab Tumse Kaha"	Lata Mangeshkar	
"Main Hoon Saqi, Tu Hai Sharabi Sharabi"	Lata Mangeshkar, Mohammed Rafi	
"Aaj Ki Raat Mere Dil Ki"	Mohammed Rafi	Pahadi
"Aayi Hai Baharen"	Mohammed Rafi	
"Balam Tere Pyar Ki Thandi Aag Mein Jalte Jalte"	Mohammed Rafi, Asha Bhosle	
"Dheere Dheere Bol, Koi Sun Lega Sajna"	Mahendra Kapoor, Asha Bhosle	
"Aaj Sakhi Ri Mori Piya"	Asha Bhosle	
