= Sati Anasuya (1935 film) =

1935 Telugu mythological film

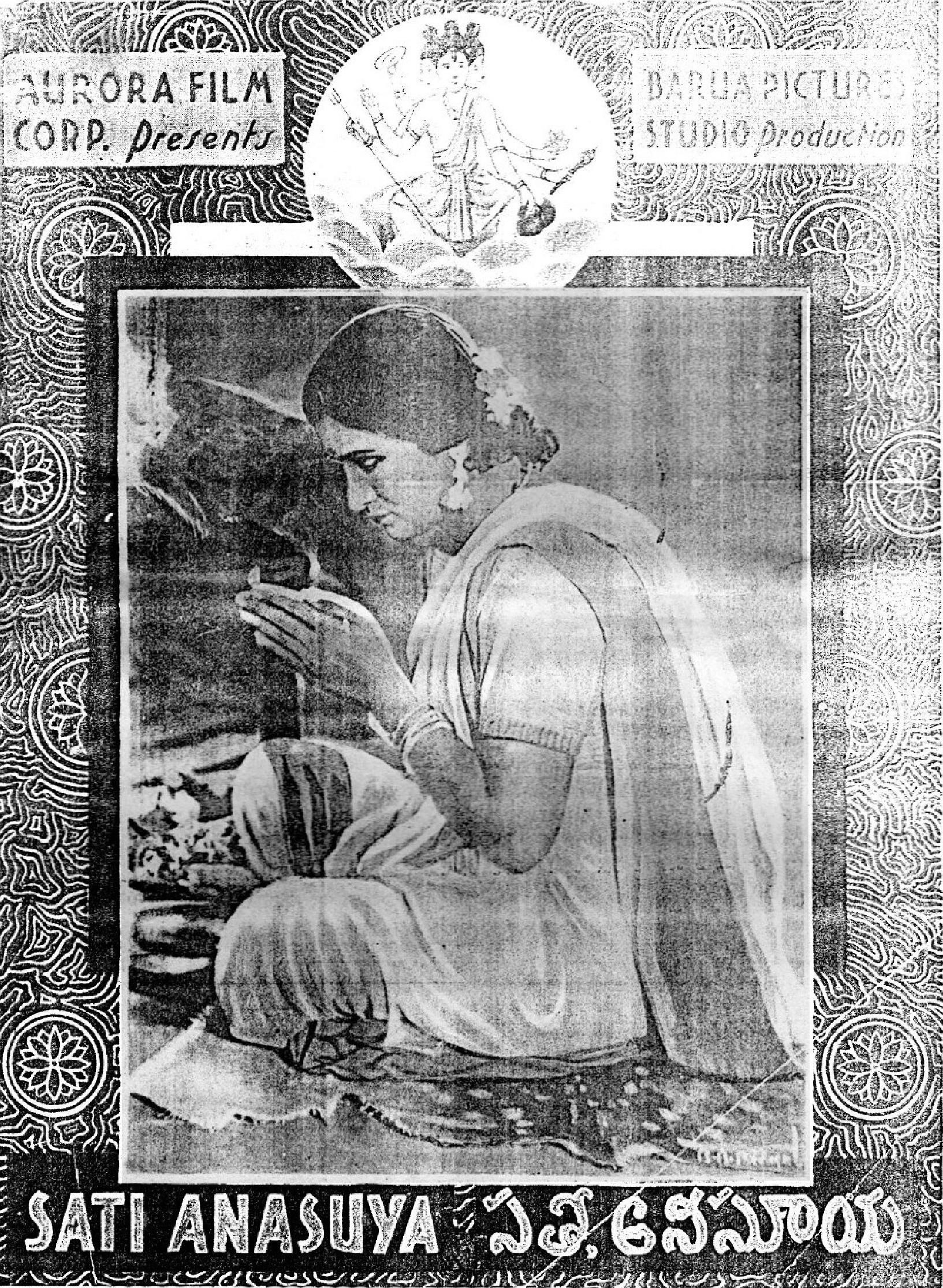
- Songbook cover of Sati Anasuya
- Directed by: Ahindra Choudhury
- Written by: Annamaacharya (dialogues)
- Produced by: Dasari Kotiratnam
- Starring: Dasari Kotiratnam; Tungala Chalapathi Rao; D. Leelakumari; D. Venkubayi; Rangapushpa Chitra
- Music by: Akula Narasimha Rao; Nimmagadda Paradesi
- Production company: Aurora Film Corporation
- Release date: 4 October 1935
- Country: India
- Language: Telugu

Sati Anasuya is a 1935 Telugu-language mythological film directed by Ahindra Choudhury and produced by Dasari Kotiratnam under the banner of Aurora Film Corporation. The film marks Kotiratnam's debut as the first female producer in Telugu cinema. Released on 4 October 1935, it stars Kotiratnam in the titular role of Anasuya, alongside D. Leelakumari, D. Venkubai, and Tungala Chalapathi Rao in prominent roles.

== Plot ==
Sati Anasuya tells the story of Anasuya, the wife of the sage Atri, renowned for her unwavering devotion and virtue. The river Ganga, worshipped across India, becomes polluted by the sins of those who bathe in her waters to cleanse themselves. Unable to bear the burden of these sins, Ganga seeks purification. She first turns to the goddesses Lakshmi, Parvati, and Saraswati, but their efforts to help her fail.

Narada advises Ganga to seek the help of Anasuya, known on Earth for her unparalleled devotion to her husband. Jealous of Anasuya’s virtue, the goddesses Lakshmi, Parvati, and Saraswati decide to test her fidelity. Simultaneously, other characters like Mallika, a woman who mistreats her husband Soma Sarma, and Narmada, a devoted wife who indulges her husband Kousika’s desires, add complexity to the narrative.

Amidst a water shortage, people visit Atri’s ashram in search of water. Anasuya fetches water for them from Ganga, who, purified by Anasuya’s devotion, relieves the world’s suffering. Mallika, realizing her mistakes after encountering Kousika, renounces worldly pleasures.

At the ashram, Bhringi, a guest, attempts to humiliate Anasuya by conjuring a devil and placing a venomous snake around her neck. However, her virtue transforms the snake into a garland of flowers.

In another subplot, Narmada’s husband Kousika accidentally touches the sage Mandavya, who curses him to die before sunrise. Through Narmada’s moral power, the sun does not rise. Anasuya, Atri, and others pray to Narmada to allow the sun to rise. Kousika dies as predicted but is later revived by Anasuya’s spiritual power, restoring him to full health. Devendra, the king of the gods, pardons Mandavya for his actions.

Spurred by their jealousy, Lakshmi, Parvati, and Saraswati send Brahma, Vishnu, and Shiva in disguise to test Anasuya further. Using her spiritual strength, Anasuya transforms the gods into babies. When the goddesses learn of this, they seek her forgiveness, and Anasuya returns their husbands to their original forms.

Narada then challenges Anasuya one final time, giving her stones to cook and serve as food. Anasuya’s virtue enables her to transform the stones into fruit, further demonstrating her moral strength. In the end, Brahma, Vishnu, and Shiva promise to be born as the son of Atri and Anasuya, manifesting as the deity Dattatreya. The story concludes with a divine glimpse of Dattatreya’s birth.

== Cast ==
- Dasari Kotiratnam as Anasuya
- D. Leelakumari as Narmada
- Tungala Chalapathi Rao as Narada
- D. Venkubayi as Lakshmi
- Rangapushpa Chitra as Ganga
- S. P. Lakshmana Swamy as Manmatha
- M. Gopala Rao as Vishnu
- N. Krishnamachary as Atri
- C. Krishnaveni

== Production ==
Sati Anasuya was a notable production in Telugu cinema, with Dasari Kotiratnam playing the lead role of Anasuya and also serving as a co-producer. After spending several months in Calcutta for the filming of Sati Sakkubai (1935), Kotiratnam observed the practices of Bengali filmmakers and was inspired by their success. This experience motivated her to produce her own film in Telugu, marking her entry into film production. Kotiratnam partnered with Aurora Film Corporation to secure support for the project. She proposed a profit-sharing model among the cast and crew. The film was directed by Ahindra Choudhury, an experienced director from Calcutta. Thus, Kotiratnam became the first female producer of Telugu cinema.

== Music ==
The film features several devotional songs and verses composed by Akula Narasimha Rao and Nimmagadda Paradesi. The soundtrack became popular during its time, resonating with the audience due to its religious and devotional appeal. Lyrics were written by Chandala Kesavadasu.

Tracklist:

1. "Ativa Satee Minna Narada Sati Anasuya"
2. "Idemanta Ghanamaina Janani"
3. "Epudu Gani Soukhyambu Nenchani" (Padyam)
4. "Kantikin Reppayatu Trikalam" (Padyam)
5. "Krute Ganga Sagaragamana Vrata" (Shlokam)
6. uKrushi Saphalama Yagunu"
7. "Kothi Mogamanivu Na Gonthu Gosinavu"
8. "Kshamiyimpumana Sadhvi Siromani"
9. "Gana Lola Vimana Kanchanamayam"
10. "Jalamu Bhavam Mee Prantamu"
11. "Tataparopakriti Paramadharmamu" (Padyam)
12. "Tanak Evvani Sirambu Daake" (Padyam)
13. "Tanumanamulu Hridishuni Padambulu" (Padyam)
14. "Dayacheta Dhanyunaitini"
15. "Dayanidhe Natanasutradhaare"
16. "Dayasagara Manobhava Dharmamani"
17. "Devuni Dayassayindi"
18. "Dhavuni Sevala Niratamu" (Padyam)
19. "Naramathi Tulasi Satee Parama Paavani"
20. "Nee Udayimpa Lokamu Gane" (Padyam)
21. "Neelila Noohimpaneela Nikilesa"
22. "Pati Paadadasi Bhagya Rasi Sati"
23. "Papulella Najalamulopala"
24. "Prasanna Atmala Laali Laali"
25. "Prahlada Gana Stambhamuloni" (Padyam)
26. "Buddhavi Nuta Dayaneeku Ledha"
27. "Bhaya Mela Neekodave Pavani"
28. "Mangalam Mangalam Mangalam"
29. "Mati Pati Paada Bhakti Maravani" (Padyam)
30. "Maatayini Maatavini Lokamata"
31. "Mora Vini Kavaraa Nathagu Bharimpa" (Padyam)
32. "Yogaratova Bhogaratova" (Shlokam)
33. "Sri Mahalakshmi Yimeme Gaurima" (Padyam)
34. "Satee Mahima Mana Maanam"
35. "Sarvamangalanchita Sadvineni" (Padyam)
36. "SarvantaraatIa Iswarudu" (Padyam)
37. "Sauseela Dharmadheena Sati"
38. "Swaantaanandamuga Srujinche"

== Release ==
Released on October 4, 1935, Sati Anasuya became a pioneering work, demonstrating the potential for Telugu films to be produced and distributed successfully. Kotiratnam's leadership in this project helped pave the way for more locally produced films and increased the involvement of women in the Telugu film industry.
