= Anasuya (disambiguation) =

Anasuya is a personage in Hindu mythology. Anasuya may also refer to

- Anasuya (film), a 2007 Indian Telugu film
- Mahasati Ansuya, a 1943 Indian Hindi film
- Mahasathi Anasuya, a 1965 Indian Kannada film
- Sati Anasuya, a story that became a basis for several Indian films
- Anasuya (given name)
