= Dasari Kotiratnam =

Indian actress, singer, and film producer

- Born: Prathipadu, Guntur district, Madras Presidency, British India (now Andhra Pradesh, India)
- Died: 21 December 1972; Chilakaluripeta, Guntur district, Andhra Pradesh, India
- Occupations: Actress; producer

Dasari Kotiratnam was an Indian actress, singer, and film producer. She was the first female producer of Telugu cinema. She was also the first actress to set up a theatre group in Andhra. Her career as a theatre actor spanned over four decades.

She produced her first film, Sati Anasuya (1935) in collaboration with Aurora Film Corporation. She later acted in films like Lanka Dahanam (1936), Mohini Bhasmasura (1938), Vara Vikrayam (1939), Panduranga Vitala (1939), Paduka Pattabhishekam (1945), Varudhini (1946), Gollabhama (1947).

== Early life ==
Dasari Kotiratnam was born in a Kapu family in Prathipadu, Guntur district of present-day Andhra Pradesh. She was born in 1898 or 1910. Her father was a stage actor and she trained under him. She began acting in plays at the age of nine. She also trained in Indian classical music under Rajanala Venkatappayya Sastri.

== Career ==
Kotiratnam played various male characters, along with female characters in theatre. After her mother died, she left Prathipadu and settled in Nakkabokkalapadu, her grandfather's village. There she founded a drama company. She was the first actress to set up a theatre company in Andhra. After five years she shifted to Guntur and continued running the drama company there. They practiced many plays and performed them in various towns and villages. She employed many artists on a payroll. She entered the film industry based on her reputation in theatre.

In 1935 Kotiratnam went to Calcutta along with her theatre troupe artists like B. V. Ramanandam and Tungala Chalapathi Rao. All of them acted in the film Sathi Sakkubai (1935) produced by Bharatalakshmi Films and directed by Charuchandra Roy. Kotiratnam played the title role of Sakkubai, while Tungala Chalapathi Rao played Lord Krishna. She was also the first woman to play a title role in Telugu films.

In collaboration with Aurora Film Corporation, Kotiratnam produced Sati Anasuya under the direction of Ahin Chowdary. She also played the title role in the film. It was released on 4 October 1935. Thus she became the first female producer of Telugu film industry. She later acted in films like Lanka Dahanam (1936), Mohini Bhasmasura (1938), Vara Vikrayam (1939), Panduranga Vitala (1939), Paduka Pattabhishekam (1945), Varudhini (1946), Gollabhama (1947).

== Death ==
In 1958, she fell ill and her voice was damaged. Her acting chances reduced as a result. In 1960, she was felicitated by Andhra Nataka Parishat in Tanuku. Kotiratnam died on 21 December 1972 in Chilakaluripeta.

== Filmography ==
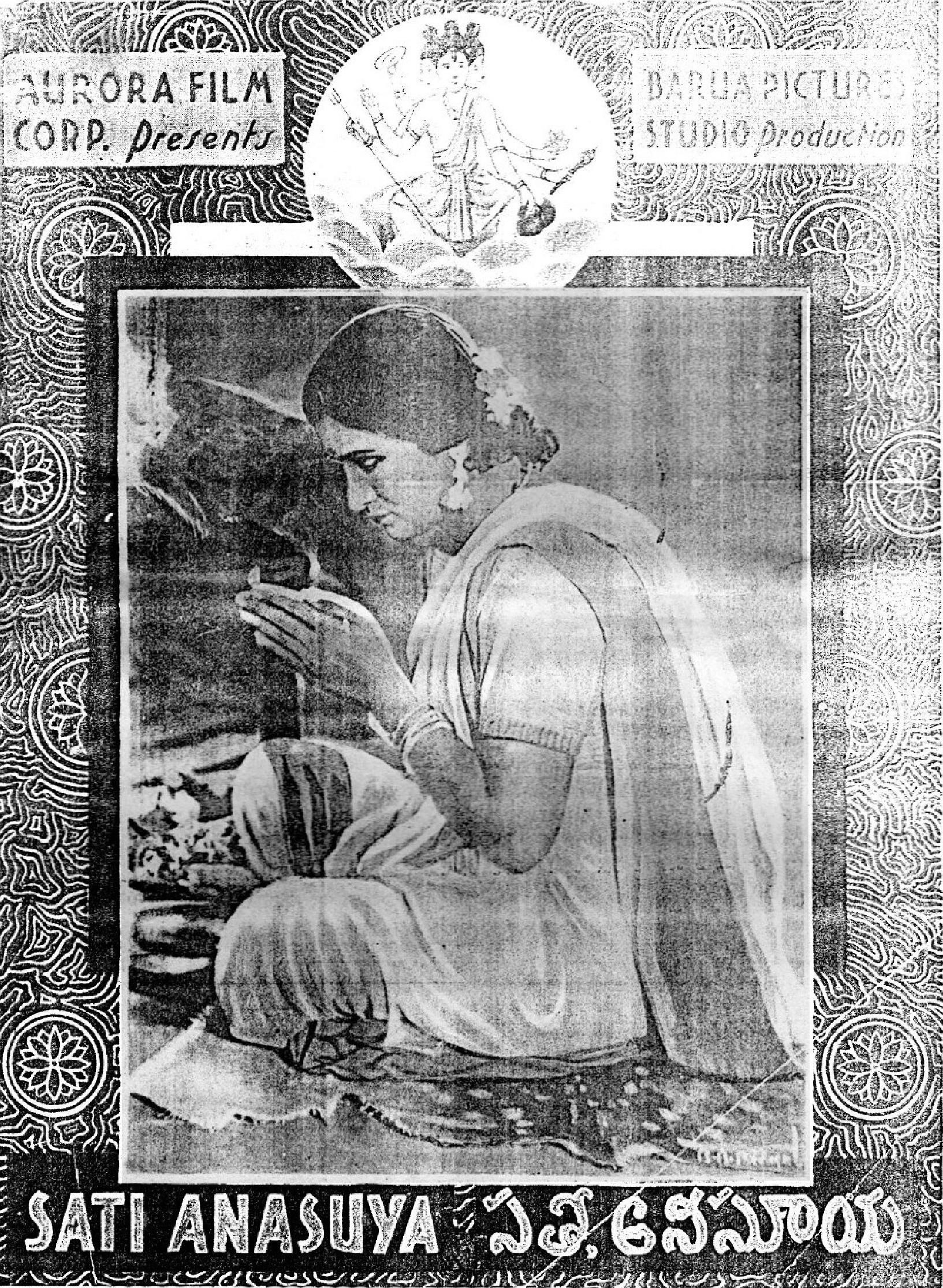
Sati Anasuya (1935) book cover

- Sathi Sakkubai (1935)
- Sati Anasuya (1935)
- Lanka Dahanam (1936)
- Mohini Bhasmasura (1938)
- Vara Vikrayam (1939)
- Panduranga Vitala (1939)
- Paduka Pattabhishekam (1945)
- Varudhini (1946)
- Gollabhama (1947)
- Radhika (1947)
- Chandravanka (1951)
- Agni Pariksha (1951)
- Bangaru Bhoomi (1954)
