= Pathala Bhairavi =

1951 film directed by Kadiri Venkata Reddy

- Theatrical release poster of the Telugu version
- Directed by: K. V. Reddy
- Screenplay by: K. V. Reddy; Kamalakara Kameswara Rao
- Story by: Pingali
- Dialogue by: Pingali
- Produced by: Nagi Reddi; Chakrapani
- Starring: N. T. Rama Rao; S. V. Ranga Rao; K. Malathi
- Cinematography: Marcus Bartley
- Edited by: C. P. Jambulingam; M. S. Money
- Music by: Ghantasala
- Production company: Vijaya Pictures
- Release date: 15 March 1951
- Running time: 195 minutes
- Languages: Telugu; Tamil

Pathala Bhairavi (transl. The Goddess of the netherworld) is a 1951 Indian fantasy film directed by K. V. Reddy who co-wrote the film with Pingali and Kamalakara Kameswara Rao. Shot simultaneously in Telugu and Tamil languages, the film was produced by Nagi Reddi and Chakrapani under the banner Vijaya Pictures. It stars N. T. Rama Rao, S. V. Ranga Rao and K. Malathi. The film focuses on a gardener's son who has to amass wealth equal to that of the king of Ujjain to marry his daughter and a sorcerer who has to sacrifice an intelligent and brave young man to Goddess Pathala Bhairavi to gain access to a statuette which can grant any wish.

Pathala Bhairavi is based on Kasi Majili Kathalu, written by Madhira Subbanna Deekshitulu, though it was also partially inspired by the story of Aladdin. As the film is shot as a bilingual, production lasted for a whole year starting from 5 February 1950 until 8 February 1951. Ghantasala composed the film's music and Marcus Bartley served as the cinematographer. The film was edited by the duo C. P. Jambulingam and M. S. Money, while Madhavapeddi Gokhale and Kaladhar were the film's art directors.

The Telugu version of Pathala Bhairavi was released on 15 March 1951, and the Tamil version on 17 May 1951. Both versions were commercially successful, with the Telugu version becoming the first in its language to have a direct run of 200 days. The Hindi dubbed version which featured two songs reshot in colour was also commercially successful. The film was also remade in Hindi as Pataal Bhairavi (1985).

Pathala Bhairavi is considered to be a breakthrough film for both Rama Rao and Ranga Rao, and was also the only South Indian film to be featured at the 1st International Film Festival of India (IFFI). On the centenary of Indian cinema in April 2013, CNN-IBN included Pathala Bhairavi in its list of "100 greatest Indian films of all time". It was featured retrospectively in the restored classics section of the 54th IFFI.

== Plot ==
The queen of Ujjain is keen for her daughter Indumathi (alias Indu) to marry the queen's brother Surasena, a timid and mentally unstable person. When the gardener's son 'Thota' Ramudu assaults Surasena at a concert for irritating the common people, he is summoned by the king to the court. His boldness leaves a considerable impression, but when Ramudu declares his love for Indu a day before his death sentence for meeting Indu secretly, the king is reminded of the astrologers' prediction that only a brave man can save her from a wicked sorcerer. He then challenges Ramudu to amass wealth equal to that of his to marry Indu, to which Ramudu agrees. He is released from prison.

Ramudu meets a Nepali sorcerer during the latter's magic show in a street. The sorcerer, who is ordered by Goddess Pathala Bhairavi during his prayers to sacrifice an intelligent and brave young man before her to be granted a statuette that grants any wish, feels that Ramudu is suitable for the sacrifice. While taking a holy bath in the nearby pond, Ramudu kills a crocodile that immediately transforms into a woman after being killed. The woman informs Ramudu that he had freed her from a hermit's curse and also reveals the sorcerer's intentions. Just before the sacrifice, Ramudu sacrifices the sorcerer and wins the statuette, consequently amassing wealth equal to that of the king. In return, the king lives up to his promise and accepts Indu's wishes to marry Ramudu.

The sorcerer's apprentice Sadajapa discovers his master dead at Pathala Bhairavi's shrine and brings him back to life with the help of Sanjeevani. Upon resurrection, the sorcerer makes a deal with Surasena, who was about to commit suicide, to bring the statuette in exchange for everything Ramudu has, including Indu. Surasena agrees and steals the statuette, then handing it over to the sorcerer which changes the fate of Ramudu and Indu, leaving the former penniless. Ramudu pledges to bring Indu his wealth back and leaves for the sorcerer's lair along with his cousin, Anji.

While they are unable to locate the sorcerer's lair, Indu refuses the sorcerer's proposal to marry him. With the help of the statuette, the sorcerer brings Ramudu to his lair and tortures him in front of Indu with the hope that she would succumb to his proposal to marry him. Posing as Sadajapa, Anji requests the sorcerer to shave his beard to win Indu's heart. The sorcerer shaves his beard, losing his powers in the process. Afterward, Ramudu finds the statuette and wishes to bring the palace back to Ujjain. In a fight between Ramudu and the sorcerer mid-way in the sky, the latter is killed by Ramudu. The palace is back in Ujjain and Surasena apologises to both Ramudu and Indu before uniting them. While Anji marries Indu's best friend, the film ends with the marriage of Ramudu and Indu.

== Cast ==
Male actors

- N. T. Rama Rao as Thota Ramudu (Telugu) / Thota Rama (Tamil)
- S. V. Ranga Rao as the Nepali sorcerer
- C. S. R. as the King of Ujjain
- Relengi as Surasena
- Valluri Balakrishna as Anji
- Padmanabham as Sadajapa

Female actors

- K. Malathi as Indumati
- T. G. Kamala as a Veera Katha performer
- Hemalathamma Rao as Indumati's mother
- Girija as Pathala Bhairavi
- Surabhi Kamalabai as Kanthamma

The uncredited cast includes Krishna Kumari as Gandharva Kanya, the woman who warns Ramudu of the sorcerer's intentions, and Savitri as a dancer in the song "Ranante Rane Ranu".

== Production ==
=== Development ===
After making their debut with Shavukaru (1950), Nagi Reddi and Chakrapani of Vijaya Productions signed K. V. Reddy later in the year to make a folklore film. The film, Pathala Bhairavi, was based on a story from Kasi Majili Kathalu, written by Madhira Subbanna Deekshitulu. Pingali adapted the content and wrote the film's story. Kamalakara Kameswara Rao and K. V. Reddy worked on the screenplay. Pingali was also inspired from the story of Aladdin. Pathala Bhairavi was made as a bilingual film, shot in Telugu and Tamil simultaneously with both the versions having the same title. The Tamil version's dialogues were written by Thanjai N. Ramaiah Dass.

T. Prakash Rao, who went on to make his directorial debut with Palletooru (1952), worked as an assistant director for the film. K. Viswanath also joined the film's crew as an assistant director, along with K. Raghava as the film's action choreographer. Marcus Bartley was recruited as the film's cinematographer and the duo C. P. Jambulingam and M. S. Money edited the film. Madhavapeddi Gokhale and Kaladhar were the film's art directors. Ghantasala composed the film's music.

=== Casting ===
Initially, director Reddy had Akkineni Nageswara Rao in mind for the lead role. He later wanted to cast Raja Reddy in the lead role but replaced him with N. T. Rama Rao in the last minute, who made his debut by playing a minor character in Mana Desam (1949). Rama Rao was eventually signed as a part of his four-film contract with Vijaya Vauhini Studios after Reddy was impressed with Rama Rao when he met him on the sets of Samsaram (1950). With this film, Rama Rao became the first actor to have acted in two languages simultaneously.

Mukkamala was initially considered for the role of the sorcerer, the film's antagonist. However with Rama Rao being signed as the protagonist, Reddy wanted to cast an actor without an image, thus S. V. Ranga Rao was signed. Ranga Rao wore costumes reminiscent of a Shakespearean anti-hero and used the catchphrase "Sahasam Seyara Dimbhaka" (Be adventurous man). He took inspiration from Shylock, the antagonist of Shakespeare's play, The Merchant of Venice, which he played when he was a stage-artist. Muthudhuta Peethambaram, who joined Vijaya Productions in 1945, helped Ranga Rao take on the appearance of a 105-year-old man with the use of make-up. Krishna Kumari and Savitiri made their debut through this film.

=== Filming ===
Pathala Bhairavi was the first big budget film produced by Vijaya Productions. The entire production lasted for a whole year starting from 5 February 1950 until 8 February 1951, due to the film being shot simultaneously in Telugu and Tamil. Pasumarthi Krishnamurthy conducted the choreography for the song sequences. Major portions of the film were shot in large sets and many trick shots were used by Bartley during the process. Both versions were filmed using an Arri 11 CBR Camera.

For scenes in the film that featured the moon in the background, a circle was drawn on a screen which was lit to make it look like the moon. Though having other lights were not possible, Bartley made sure that all the characters in such scenes had their shadows away from the moon. Despite this, many of the transformations of elements in this film were shown using dissolve techniques. No lights were hidden behind the painted moon, as a source for lighting.

== Themes ==
According to K. N. T. Sastry in his book Alanati Chalana Chitram, the film begins with the theme of Dhairye Sahase Lakshmi (Bravery gives wealth) which is present throughout the film. While the characters of Rama Rao and Ranga Rao epitomise heroism, the character of the princess played by Malathi epitomises innocence and sensuality. Pathala Bhairavi sets up an opposition between the worship of Rama by the protagonist's mother and the worship of Pathala Bhairavi by the sorcerer; the former being a frequent one inhabited in a domestic space while the latter being an uncivilised one.

According to Azim Premji University liberal studies faculty member S. V. Srinivas, Pathala Bhairavi was a blend of folklore and social drama. Srinivas stated that the depiction of the goddess Pathala Bhairavi before Ramudu sacrifices the sorcerer was reminiscent of the representation of Poleramma worship by Dalits in the film Mala Pilla (1938). He added that Pathala Bhairavi "ratifies certain social relationships by presenting them as natural and given" and "at the same time, some other practices are presented as inhuman and uncivilised".

== Music ==
Pathala Bhairavi

Soundtrack album To Pathala Bhairavi by Ghantasala
- Released: 1 December 1950
- Genre: Feature film soundtrack
- Length: 27:07
- Language: Telugu
- Label: His Master's Voice
- Producer: Ghantasala

The soundtrack of Pathala Bhairavi was composed by Ghantasala, the lyrics of which were written by Pingali and Thanjai N. Ramaiah Dass for the Telugu and Tamil versions respectively. The sound mixing process was supervised by A. Krishnan and Siva Ram. It was processed by N. C. Sen Gupta and was orchestrated by A. Krishnamurthy. The songs were composed using Mohana, Bhimpalasi and Sindhu Bhairavi ragas, with "Prema Kosamai Valalo Padene" and "Kanugona Galano" notably being modulated on the same raga. The soundtrack was released on 1 December 1950. Also, a digitally remastered version was released and marketed by His Master's Voice in 2003; the album cover depicts a still image from the film featuring Rama Rao and Malathi.

Relangi sang the comedy song "Vinave Bala Naa Prema Gola" which was filmed on himself. A costly Hammond organ was specially imported for this film which was played by Master Venu. For the Hindi dubbed version, T. G. Kamala Devi sang the song "Sunloji Sardaro" ("Ithihasam Vinnaara" in Telugu) and Jikki sang the song "Bindiya Chamke" ("Vagaloi Vagalu" in Telugu). The latter became the first Telugu film singer to record a song for a Hindi film with this Hindi dubbed version of Pathala Bhairavi.

Track list – Telugu version
No.	Title	Artist(s)	Length
1.	"Theeyani Oohalu"	P. Leela and Chorus	02:46
2.	"Ithihasam Vinnaara"	T. G. Kamala Devi	03:22
3.	"Kalavaramaye"	Ghantasala and P. Leela	02:54
4.	"Entha Ghatu Premayo"	P. Leela and Ghantasala	03:28
5.	"Vinave Bala Naa Prema Gola"	Relangi	02:39
6.	"Vagaloi Vagalu"	Jikki and Chorus	04:17
7.	"Prema Kosamai Valalo Padene"	V. J. Varma	02:48
8.	"Hayiga"	Ghantasala and P. Leela	02:41
9.	"Kanugona Galano"	Ghantasala	02:48
10.	"Ranathe Raneravoyi"	P. Nageswara Rao and T. G. Saraswathi	01:24
Total length:			27:07

Track list – Tamil version
No.	Title	Artist(s)	Length
1.	"Ithikasam Kaeteera"	T. G. Kamala Devi with group	03:30
2.	"Ennathaan Un Premaiyo"	P. Leela and Ghantasala	03:24
3.	"Mathavel Kanaiya"	Jikki	03:30
4.	"Prema Paasathaal"	V. J. Varma	02:51
5.	"Uyirudan Unnai Kaanbeno"	Ghantasala	02:46
6.	"Aananthame Tharum"	Jikki and P. Leela	02:47
7.	"Amaithi Illa En Maname"	Ghantasala and P. Leela	03:02
8.	"Kanintha Kadhalarukku"	Ghantasala and P. Leela	02:31
9.	"Kaniye Nane Kadhal"	Relangi
10.	"Naan Maaten Neeyum"	P. Nageswara Rao and T. G. Saraswathi	01:08
Total length:			21:59

== Release ==
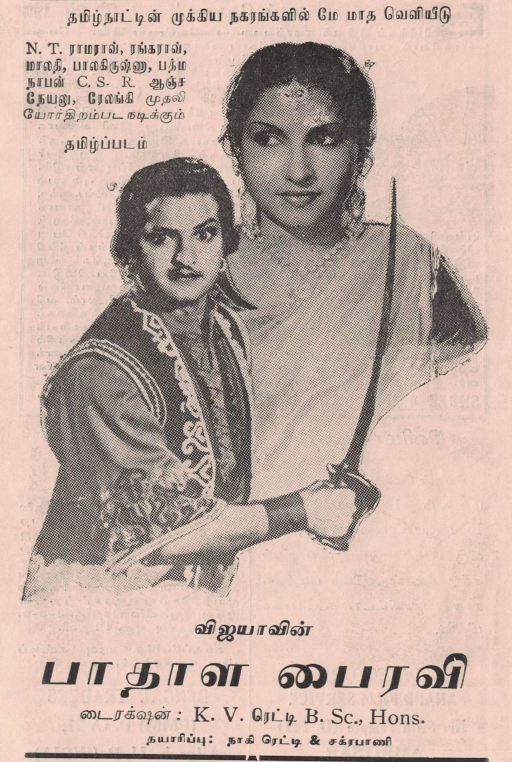
Theatrical release poster of the Tamil version

The Telugu version of Pathala Bhairavi was released on 15 March 1951, and the Tamil version was released two months later on 17 May 1951. Both versions were commercially successful, with the Telugu version completing a theatrical run of 100 days. (Note: While A. S. Sashidhar of The Times of India states the number of theatres where the film completed the 100th day of its theatrical run to be 28, Srivastava Banerjee, in his book One Hundred Indian Feature Films: An Annotated Filmography claims it to be in 34 theatres.) Pathala Bhairavi became the first Telugu film to run continuously for 175 days, and the first Telugu film to have a direct run of 200 days. It completed the 175th day of its theatrical run in a total of 13 theatres.

S. S. Vasan acquired the film's Hindi dubbing rights and reshot two song sequences – "Ithihasam Vinnara" and "Vagaloi Vagalu" in colour. The Hindi dubbed version was commercially successful. Pathala Bhairavi was the only South Indian film to be screened at the first International Film Festival of India held at Mumbai on 24 January 1952. Sahitya Surabhi organised a programme at the Visakha Public Library in Visakhapatnam on 7 March 2015 on the eve of the 64th anniversary of this film's release and writer Rambhatla Nrusimha Sastry attended the programme as the chief guest.

=== Critical reception ===
Pathala Bhairavi received critical acclaim. A. Seshagiri Rao of Zamin Ryot writing his review on 16 March 1951 called Pathala Bharavi a landmark film, not just for Telugu cinema but for Indian cinema as well. He praised Reddy's direction and observed that the team spirit of the cast and crew in making this film was visible. On 4 April 1951, Andhra Patrika opined that Pathala Bhairavi was a film made intelligently, and compared the story to that of a train which runs tirelessly without halting for a second. While praising the character of the Nepali sorcerer and Ranga Rao for his portrayal, the reviewer criticised the film for poorly developing the other characters, in contrast to Shavukaru. In his 1988 book One Hundred Indian Feature Films: An Annotated Filmography, Srivastava Banerjee gave a polarised review of the film by calling it "an extraordinarily meaningless modern myth".

In his book, ‘The Age of Heroes—The Incredible World of Telugu Cinema“, Mukesh Manjunath points out how a lot of the structuring and conceits seen in KV Reddy’s Pathala Bhairavi have prominently shaped Telugu cinema.

== Cancelled plans of digitisation and colourisation ==
In late November 2007, a Hyderabad-based company named Goldstone Technologies acquired the film negative rights of 14 Telugu films produced by Vijaya Vauhini Studios, including Mayabazar (1957) and Pathala Bhairavi, to release their digitally re-mastered versions in colour. After the success of the digitised and colourised version of Mayabazar released in January 2010, its makers announced that Pathala Bhairavi would be the next film to be remastered and re-released in colour. However Goldstone Technologies decided not to remaster the remaining 14 films including Pathala Bhairavi, saying that most of the producers who sold the rights of the negatives to TV channels lost control over them, adding that there were also a lot of legal issues over ownership and copyright issues whenever other producers try to do something on their own.

== Legacy and impact ==
"Pathala Bhairavi's importance lies in laying the groundwork for the emergence in the Telugu film industry of the star-system as we know it today. Pathala Bhairavi offers a promise of fulfilment of certain expectations of the protagonist, expectations which are themselves introduced by the narrative."

— S. V. Srinivas, faculty member of liberal studies at Azim Premji University, Bangalore.

Pathala Bhairavi achieved cult status in Telugu cinema; in July 2010, Hemanth Kumar of South Scope called Pathala Bhairavi a film that "took an entire generation by storm" and praised its special effects in particular, which Kumar felt were ahead of their time. The lines "Nijam Cheppamantara Abaddham Cheppamantara" ("Shall I say the truth? or shall I lie?"), "Sahasam Seyara Dimbhaka" ("Be adventurous man!"), "Naruda Yemi Nee Korika?" ("O Human, what is your desire?") became popular and phrases such as "dingari" ("servant") and "dimbhaka" ("fool") later became a part of Telugu vernacular. The film's story is regularly staged as a play by Surabhi theatre group, known as Sri Venkateswara Natya Mandali.

During a programme Telugu Cinema Prasthanam organised by the film society of Visakhapatnam, writer include actor Raavi Kondala Rao placed Pathala Bhairavi among other cult films like Raja Harishchandra (1913), Bhakta Prahlada (1932), Mala Pilla (1938), Devadasu (1953), and Lava Kusa (1963) during a speech on the role of Telugu cinema in the hundred years of Indian cinema. On the centenary of Indian cinema in April 2013, CNN-IBN included Pathala Bhairavi in its list, "The 100 greatest Indian films of all time".

Rana Daggubati (left) and Raghu Babu (right) as artistes from Surabhi theatre group performing a play based on Pathala Bhairavi in the film Krishnam Vande Jagadgurum (2012).

The film is considered to be a breakthrough film for both Rama Rao and Ranga Rao. Rama Rao later starred in other folklore films like Chandirani (1953), Rechukka (1954), and Jayasimha (1955); all of which were commercially successful. When the film's unit was travelling by train to attend the 100th day celebrations of Pathala Bhairavi at Bellary, the then Union Home Minister C. Rajagopalachari was travelling in Madras Mail. When both the trains happened to halt at Guntakal, people who had come to greet Rajagopalachari rushed to the other platform to have a glimpse of the film's unit, which left Rajagopalachari amazed by the popularity that the film had attained.

Pathala Bhairavi was also remade in Hindi, 34 years after the release of the original film, as Pataal Bhairavi (1985) starring Jeetendra and Jaya Prada. Pathala Bhairavi inspired Vijaya Productions along with its collaborator Chandamama to produce Bhairava Dweepam (1994) directed by Singeetam Srinivasa Rao starring Rama Rao's son Nandamuri Balakrishna in the lead along with Roja.

In the pre-climax sequences of the Telugu film Okkadu (2003), when Obul Reddy (played by Prakash Raj) is about to murder Ajay (played by Mahesh Babu), the latter compares the former with Ranga Rao's character in Pathala Bhairavi who was murdered by Rama Rao's character. The film's story was used as a play in the Telugu film Krishnam Vande Jagadgurum (2012), which was based on the Surabhi theatre group.

== See also ==
- Pataal Bhairavi

== Bibliography ==
- Banerjee, Srivastava (2013) [1988]. One Hundred Indian Feature Films: An Annotated Filmography. Routledge. ISBN 978-1-135-84105-8.
- Pillai, Swarnavel Eswaran (2015). Madras Studios: Narrative, Genre, and Ideology in Tamil Cinema. SAGE Publications. ISBN 978-93-5150-212-8.
- "Southscope July 2010". South Scope. 2010.
