= Atri's Eclipse =

Earliest reference of the solar eclipse

- Date: 22 October 4202 BC or 19 October 3811 BC (As per claim)
- Also known as: Atri's Total Solar Eclipse
- Type: Solar Eclipse
- Total Solar Eclipse mentioned by the Vedic sage Atri in Rigaveda

Atri's Eclipse is a total solar eclipse mentioned in the Indian text Rigaveda. It has been claimed by some modern astronomical scholars to be the earliest reference of the solar eclipse mentioned in any historical astronomy of the world. The claim for the earliest reference of the total solar eclipse was published in a paper by the Journal of Astronomical History and Heritage.

== Etymology ==
The text Rigaveda doesn't directly mention the word Atri's Eclipse but it has been termed by the modern scholars to identify the total solar eclipse mentioned in the text Rigaveda by the sage Atri in the form of poetic hymns.

Indian scholar Bal Gangadhar Tilak in his commentary on Vedic literature mentioned Atri's Eclipse to identify the total solar eclipse in the Rigaveda mentioned by the Vedic sage Atri. Similarly Robert Garfinkle in his book Luna Cognita also discussed about the Atri's Eclipse.

== Background ==
In the text Rigveda, there is a story of the sage Atri who demolished an asura Swarbhanu for the liberation of the sun from a total solar eclipse. In the story it is said that due to the influence of the asura, the sun suddenly disappeared during the day and made people feel scared in the darkness. Then the sage Atri demolished the asura Swarbhanu and regained the glory of sun. The language of the Rigveda is very symbolic having hidden meaning, making it difficult to comprehend in the form of historical events. Although the disappearing of the sun in the story has been interpreted by the astronomers as the total solar eclipse.

The Chapter 24 verse 3 in the text Sankhyayana Brahmana of Rigveda mentions the location of the rising Sun during the spring equinox in its passages. In one reference there is a description of the spring equinox occurring in Orion, and in another description it occurred in the Pleiades. These descriptions have been used as the bases for the calculation of the dates of the Atri's Eclipse.

== Description ==
According to the paper published in the Journal of Astronomical History and Heritage, the Indian astronomer Mayank Vahia from Tata Institute of Fundamental Research and the Japanese astronomer Misturu Soma from National Astronomical Observatory of Japan have found the reference of the earliest total solar eclipse in the text Rigveda mentioned by the Vedic sage Atri. According to Tilak 's interpretation the eclipse occurred when the Vernal equinox was in Orion, and three days prior to the Autumnal equinox. The astronomers Mayank Vahia and Misturu Soma have identified the date of the solar eclipse as on 22 October 4202 BC or on 19 October 3811 BC.

The astronomers have also claimed that the story of the Atri's Eclipse is different and older from the general stories of Rahu and Ketu for the eclipses in the Hindu mythology.
