= Vakkalanka Sarala =

Playback singer in Telugu cinema

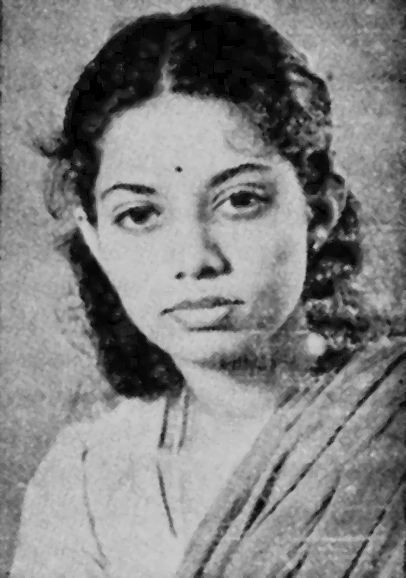
- Vakkalanka Sarala in 1953
- Born: 8 August 1927; Chennai

Vakkalanka Sarala (8 August 1927 – 1999) was a playback singer in Telugu cinema. She is renowned for singing the song "Kaadu Suma Kala Kaadu Suma" in the movie Keelugurram. During the 1940s, she worked as an assistant music director in the Hindi department of Gemini Studios. Her ancestors were Brahmins from Amalapuram, but the family settled in Madras. Sarala's father, Gopal Rao, was the brother of Chalam (Gurazada Venkatachalam). Sarala was born on 8 August 1927, in Madras to Sundaramma and Gopal Rao. Her mother, Sundaramma, was also a classical singer.

She was a close friend of actress Anjali Devi. Sarala sang the song "Idhi Thiyani Vennela Reyi" for Anjali Devi's first film, Balraju. Since then, they became good friends. In the 1950s, after Anjali Devi produced the film Swapnasundari, Sarala promised Anjali that if she had a daughter, she would name her after the movie. Keeping her word, ten years later, she named her daughter Swapnasundari. Swapnasundari went on to become a Kuchipudi dancer and a recipient of the Padma Bhushan.

Sarala sang many songs alongside Ghantasala, including "Kaadu Suma Kala Kaadu Suma." She was engaged to marry Ghantasala, but unforeseen circumstances led Ghantasala to marry another woman, also named Sarala, from Rangoon.

After her marriage, Sarala retired from the film industry. During those times, women in South India generally left the industry after marriage. Sarala had two daughters, including Swapnasundari, and one son. Her daughter Vakkalanka Padma acted in the movie Gorintaku, released in 1979.

Sarala's daughter Swapnasundari organizes an annual Carnatic music concert named Swaralahari on 8 August, in her mother's memory. In this concert, young singers prominently perform the songs composed by Sarala.

== List of Telugu Film Songs by Sarala ==
Year	Film name	Song	Other Singers	Music director	Lyricist
1948	Balraju	Tiyani Vennela Reyi Eda Bayani Vennela Hayi		Ghantasala	Samudrala Senior
1949	Keelugurram	Aha Oho Enthaanandam Baaye Nahaa Uhaateetamuga		Ghantasala	Taapi
1949	Keelugurram	Kaadu Suma Kala Kaadu Suma Amritapanamunu	Ghantasala	Ghantasala	Taapi
1949	Raksharekha	Bidiyama Manalo Priyatama Sakha Biguva Chalu Naatho		Ogirala Ramachandra Rao	Balijepalli
1949	Laila Majnu	Anaganaga O Khanu Aa Khanuko Janaana	Bhanumathi	C.R. Subbaraman	Samudrala Senior
1952	Singari	Shuddham Cheyyandoi Tholanchi Shuddham Cheyyandoi	Tangavelu and group	S.V. Venkatraman, T.K. Ramanathan; T.A. Kalyanam	
1952	Maradalu Pelli	Piliche Godavaroadu Nooruurinche Bandaru Laddoo		Chittoor Nagaiah, Tanguturi Surya Kumari	Sri Sri
1953	Amarakavi			G. Ramanathan, T.K. Kumaraswami	
