= Bhama Vijayam =

- Theatrical release poster
- Directed by: C. Pullaiah
- Written by: Samudrala Jr. (dialogues)
- Screenplay by: Somashekar
- Story by: Somashekar
- Produced by: Somasekhar; Radha Krishna
- Starring: N. T. Rama Rao; Devika
- Cinematography: Veerappa
- Edited by: K. S. Prasad; Ravikanth
- Music by: T. V. Raju
- Production company: Shekar Films
- Release date: 29 June 1967
- Running time: 161 minutes
- Country: India
- Language: Telugu

Bhama Vijayam (transl. Young Lady's Victory) is a 1967 Indian Telugu-language swashbuckler film, produced by Somasekhar and Radha Krishna, and directed by C.Pulliah. It stars N. T. Rama Rao and Devika, with music composed by T. V. Raju. The film is based on Gollabhama (1947) which itself is based on the stories of Kaasi Majililu written in Telugu by Madhira Subbanna Deekshitulu.

== Cast ==
- N. T. Rama Rao as Jaya Chandra
- Devika as Sundari
- V. Nagayya as Saint
- Relangi as Gunapathi
- Rajanala as Kalinga Bhupati Kamavardhanudu
- Dhulipala as Udayarka Maharaju
- Mukkamala as King
- Chadalavada
- Raja Babu
- Nagaraju
- Jagga Rao
- Vijaya Nirmala as Vauhini
- L. Vijayalakshmi as Mohini
- S. Varalakshmi as Queen
- Girija as Sarasa
- Rushyendramani

== Soundtrack ==
Music composed by T. V. Raju.

S. No.	Song title	Lyrics	Singers	Length
1	"Pairugaali Veechindi"	C. Narayana Reddy	P. Susheela	3:44
2	"Oho Yuvaraani"	Samudrala Sr.	Ghantasala	3:15
3	"Rendu Chandamaamalu"	Samudrala Sr.	Ghantasala, Shobarani	3:26
4	"Raaraa Sundaraa"	Samudrala Jr.	P. Susheela	4:21
5	"Okkasari Nannuchudu"	C. Narayana Reddy	Madhavapeddi Satyam, Swaranalatha	3:37
6	"Raave Cheli Oh Jabili"	Samudrala Jr.	Ghantasala, P. Susheela	2:49
7	"Bhuvana Mohini"	Samudrala Sr.	Ghantasala	6:01
8	"Nippulanti Seetamma"	Samudrala Jr.	Ghantasala	3:38
9	"Korinavade Cheli"	C. Narayana Reddy	P. Susheela	3:29
10	"Magaraaya"	C. Narayana Reddy	P. Susheela	3:40
