= Sati Anasuya (1957 film) =

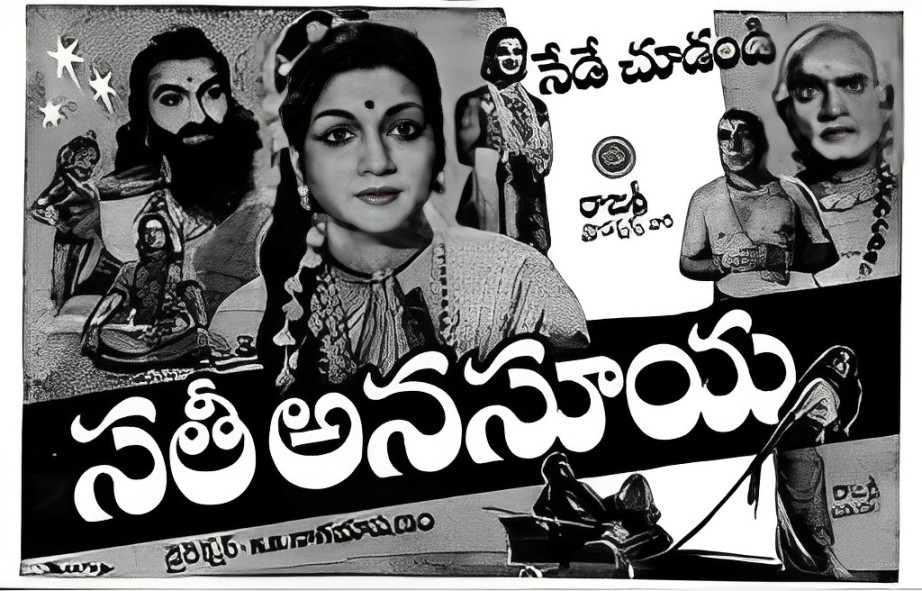
- Theatrical release poster
- Directed by: K. B. Nagabhushanam
- Written by: Samudrala Jr (dialogues)
- Based on: Life of Anasuya
- Produced by: Sundarlal Nehata
- Starring: N. T. Rama Rao; Anjali Devi; Jamuna
- Cinematography: Kamal Ghosh
- Edited by: N. K. Gopal
- Music by: Ghantasala
- Production company: Rajyasri Productions
- Release date: 27 October 1957
- Running time: 142 minutes
- Country: India
- Language: Telugu

Sati Anasuya is a 1957 Telugu-language Hindu mythological film, based on the life of Anasuya, produced by Sundarlal Nehata under the Rajyasri Productions banner and directed by K. B. Nagabhushanam. It stars N. T. Rama Rao, Anjali Devi, and Jamuna, with music composed by Ghantasala.

This film was dubbed into Tamil under the same title and released in 1958. Udhayakumar wrote the dialogues and Ku. Sa. Krishnamoorthy penned the lyrics. T. M. Ibrahim scored music for this Tamil version.

== Cast ==
- N. T. Rama Rao as Kaushikudu
- Anjali Devi as Anasuya
- Jamuna as Narmada
- Kanta Rao as Vishnu
- Gummmadi as Atri Mahamuni
- Relangi as Sukhanand
- Rajanala as Indra
- Padmanabham as Narada Maharshi
- Mukkamala as Sivanandudu
- Amarnath as Shiva
- K. V. S. Sarma as Kaushika (on curse)
- A. V. Subba Rao as Mandavyamuni
- Seshagiri as Brahma
- N. Rajanraju as Manmadha
- Suryakala as Parvathi
- Mohana as Lakshmi
- Satyavathi as Saraswati
- C. Varalakshmi as Dubbakka
- Chandra Kumari as Ganga
- Ragini as Rambha
- Kusalakumari as Rati

== Soundtrack ==
Sati Anasuya

Film score by Ghantasala
- Released: 1957
- Genre: Soundtrack
- Producer: Ghantasala

Music composed by Ghantasala.

S. No.	Song title	Singers	Lyrics	Length
1	"Aayi Aayi Aayi Aapadalu Kaayi"	Ghantasala		02:08
2	"Ide Nyayama Ide Dharmama"	Ghantasala, Madhavapeddi Satyam & J. V. Raghavulu		03:28
3	"Maa Roopa Nava Shobana"	M. L. Vasanthakumari		03:55
4	"Ooge Radigo"	P. Leela		02:55
5	"Jayaho Jayaho Bharata Janani"	Ghantasala		
6	"Enthentha Dooram"	Madhavapeddi Satyam & K. Rani		02:28
7	"Udayinchunoyi Nee Jeevitana"	Ghantasala		04:05
8	"Kadilindi Ganga Bhavani"	Ghantasala & M. S. Rama Rao		03:15
9	"O Sakha Oho Sakha Neevedano"	Ghantasala & Jikki		03:45
10	"Oh Jagadaadhaara"	P. Leela		02:57
11	"Jaya Jaya Deva Hare"	Ghantasala		02:52
12	"Vinumoyi O Naruda Nijam"	Ghantasala		

== Reception ==
Malhar of Zaminryot criticized the movie as poorly made and termed it as a "sugar coated pill". He reviewed the story and the characterization as bad. He wrote positively about the performance by the main cast.
