= Aurora Productions =

Aurora Productions may refer to:

- Aurora Productions, Hollywood
- Aurora Film Corporation in Kolkata, India
- Aurora Productions, a media arm of Family International
