= Malaya Mountains =

Mythological mountains in South India

The Malaya Mountains were a range of mountains that were mentioned in the Hindu sacred texts like Matsya Purana, the Kurma Purana, the Vishnu Purana, and the epics of the Ramayana and the Mahabharata, which is present day Kerala.

The Vishnu Purana specifically mentions it amongst the seven main chains of mountains in Bharata (India), namely Mahendra, Malaya, Sahya, Śuktimat, Riksha, Vindhya, and Páripátra. According to the Matsya Purana, during the Great flood, the giant boat of King Manu was perched after the deluge on the top of the Malaya Mountains.

These mountains are believed to have formed the southernmost part (southwards starting from the Mangalore region) of the Western Ghats, modern day Kerala, while the Northern part of the same was called the Sahya Mountains. The peaks of these Malaya mountains were said to be higher than those of the Sahya Mounta. Sangam Literature calls these mountains Pothigai.
