= Sati Anasuya =

Sati Anasuya is a story that has been made into many Indian films in different languages. It has been made into the Telugu language in 1935, 1936, 1957 and 1971.

== Plot ==
The story of Anasuya is the basis for these films with some cinematic changes.

== Sati Anasuya (1935 film) ==
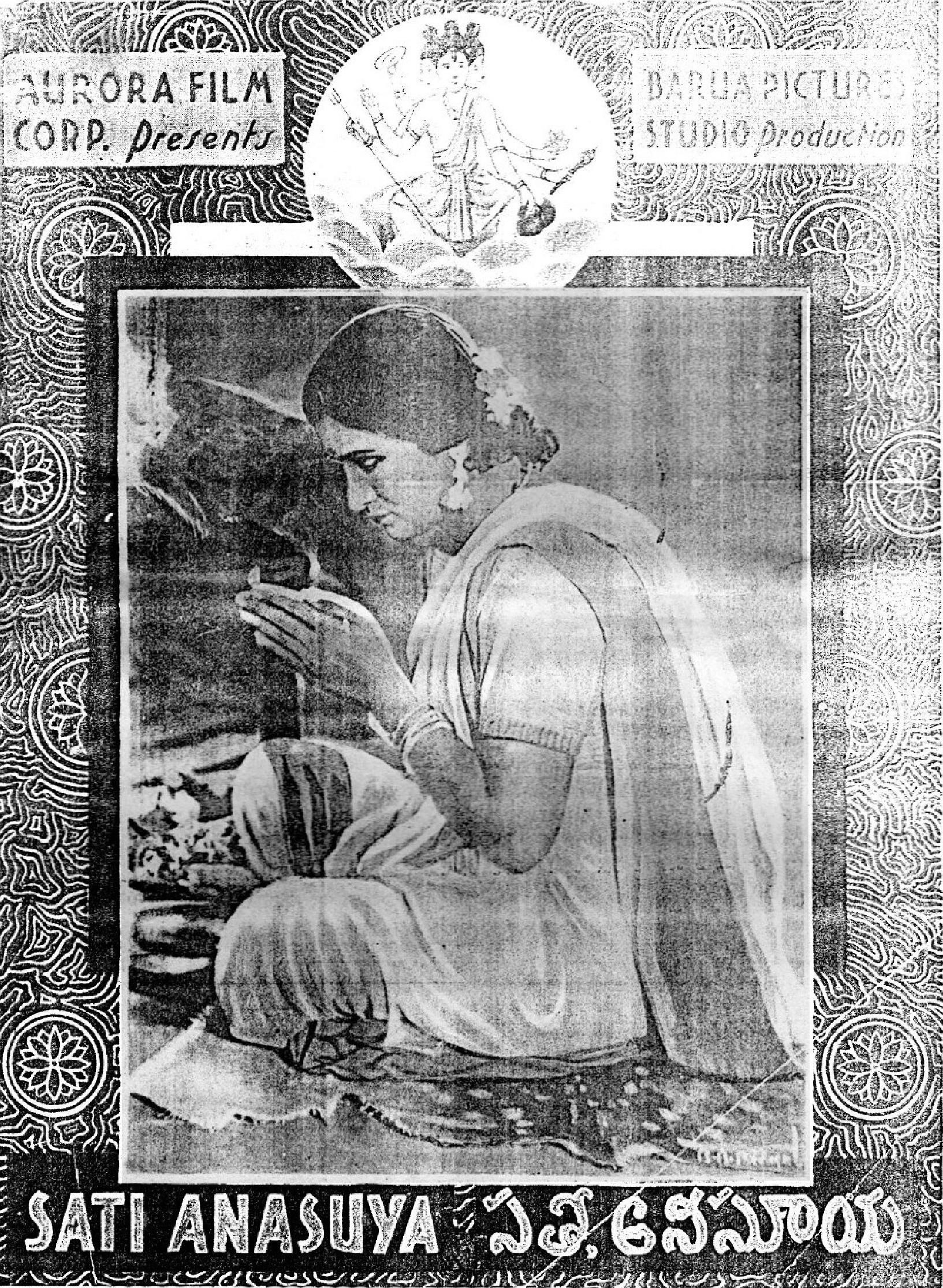
Sati Anasuya, 1935 film book cover.

It is produced by Aurora Film Corporation based in Calcutta. Dasari Kotiratnam played the title role of Anasuya.

=== Cast ===
- Dasari Kotiratnam as Anasuya
- Tungala Chalapati Rao as Narada

== Anasuya (1936 film) ==
=== Cast ===
- C. Krishnaveni
- Prakash Rao
- Suryanarayana
- Narayanrao
- P. Sundaramma
- R. Balasaraswathi Devi
- C. S. R

== Sati Anasuya (1957 film) ==
=== Cast ===
- Anjali Devi as Anasuya
- Gummadi
- N.T.Rama Rao

=== Soundtrack ===
The music for the film was composed by Ghantasala. Playback singers were Ghantasala, M. S. Rama Rao, Madhavapeddi Satyam, J. V. Raghavulu, M. L. Vasanthakumari, P. Leela, Jikki, P. Leela & K. Rani.

S. No.	Song title	Singers	Lyrics	Duration (mm:ss)
1	"Aayi Aayi Aayi Aapadalu Kaayi"	Ghantasala		02:08
2	"Ide Nyayama Ide Dharmama"	Ghantasala, Madhavapeddi Satyam & J. V. Raghavulu		03:28
3	"Maa Roopa Nava Shobana"	M. L. Vasanthakumari		03:55
4	"Ooge Radigo"	P. Leela		02:55
5	"Jayaho Jayaho Bharata Janani"	Ghantasala		
6	"Enthentha Dooram"	Madhavapeddi Satyam & K. Rani		02:28
7	"Udayinchunoyi Nee Jeevitana"	Ghantasala		04:05
8	"Kadilindi Ganga Bhavani"	Ghantasala & M. S. Rama Rao		03:15
9	"O Sakha Oho Sakha Neevedano"	Ghantasala & Jikki		03:45
10	"Oh Jagadaadhaara"	P. Leela		02:57
11	"Jaya Jaya Deva Hare"	Ghantasala		02:52
12	"Vinumoyi O Naruda Nijam"	Ghantasala		

== Sati Anasuya (1971 film) ==
=== Cast ===
- Jamuna as Anasuya
- Sarada as Sumati
- Kantha Rao as Atri Maharshi
- Prabhakar Reddy as Shiva
- Sobhan Babu as Narada
- Rajanala as Sivanandam
- Rajababu as Sukhanandam
- Satyanarayana
- Venniradai Nirmala

=== Soundtrack ===
- "Aalayamela Archanalela Aradhanalela" (Singer: P. Susheela)
- "Enni Janmala Enni Nomula Punyamo" (Singer: P. Susheela)
- "Himagiri Mandira Girija Sundara" (Singer: P. Susheela)by
