= Sobhanachala Studios =

Indian film production company

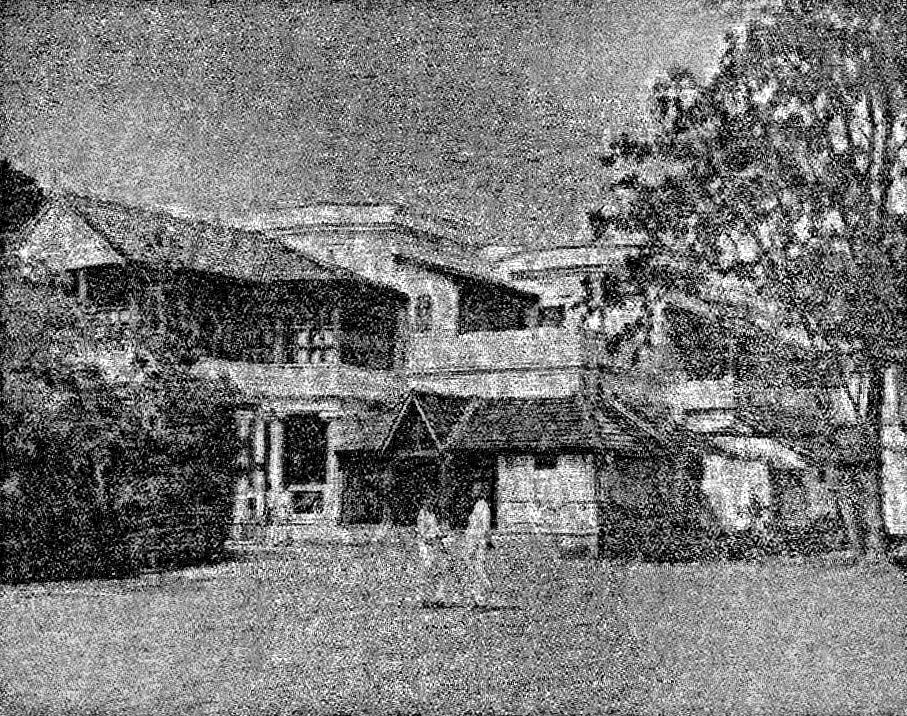
- Native name: శోభనాచల స్టూడియోస్
- Type: Limited
- Industry: Film
- Founded: 1941
- Founder: Meka Venkatramaiah Appa Rao Bahadur (Raja of Mirzapuram)
- Headquarters: Madras (now Chennai), India
- Key people: Meka Venkatramaiah Appa Rao Bahadur, C. Krishnaveni
- Products: Motion pictures

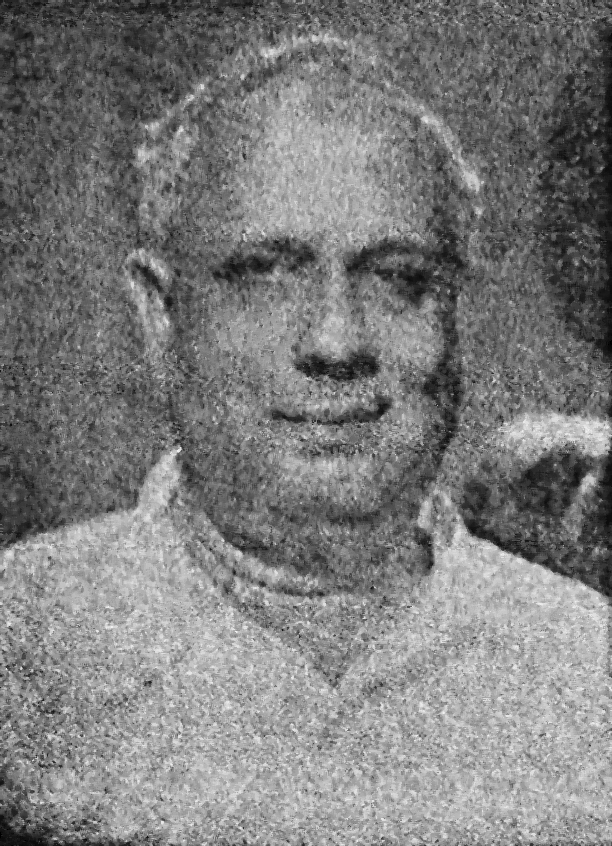
Raja of Mirzapuram

Sobhanachala Studios was an Indian film production company that played a significant role in the early development of Telugu cinema. Established in 1941 in Teynampet, Madras, it was among the first studios in the city owned by a Telugu person. The studio was established by Meka Venkatramaiah Appa Rao Bahadur, the Raja of Mirzapuram, who had earlier produced films under the Jaya Films banner.

Sobhanachala Studios was known for introducing numerous technicians and artists to the Telugu film industry. Notable figures launched by the studio include actress Anjali Devi (Gollabhama), actor N. T. Rama Rao (Mana Desam), and singer Ghantasala (Lakshmamma).

The studio's debut film was Daksha Yagnam (1941). Among its most notable productions are Gollabhama (1947), Keelu Gurram (1949), Mana Desam (1949), Lakshmamma (1950) and Tilottama (1951). These films were influential in the early history of Telugu talkie cinema during the 1940s. However, with the emergence of Vauhini Studios, the production output of Sobhanachala Studios began to decline. In 1955, the studio was sold and rebranded as Venus Studios, which operated for a decade before becoming defunct in the late 1950s.

== Filmography ==
Films produced on Jaya Films banner:

- Jarasandha (1938)
- Mahananda (1939)
- Bhoja Kalidasu (1940)
- Jeevana Jyothi (1940)

Films produced on Sobhanachala Pictures banner:

- Daksha Yagnam (1941)
- Bhishma (1944)
- Gollabhama (1947)
- Mahathma Udangar (1947)
- Madalasa (1948)
- Keelu Gurram (1949)
- Mana Desam (1949)
- Lakshmamma (1950)
- Tilottama (1951)
- Gramapennu (1951) (Tamil)
- Prajaseva (1952)
- Saavasam (1952)
