= Anasuya (given name) =

Anasuya is an Indian feminine given name that may refer to

- Anasuya, a personage in Hindu mythology
- Anasuya (film), a 2007 Telugu-language film
- Anasuya Bharadwaj, Indian television presenter and actress
- Anasuya Devī (1923–1985), Indian spiritual leader
- Anasuya Sarabhai, pioneer of the women's labour movement in India
- Anasuya Shankar (1928–1963), Indian writer of modern fiction
