= Gollabhama =

1947 film by C. Pullayya

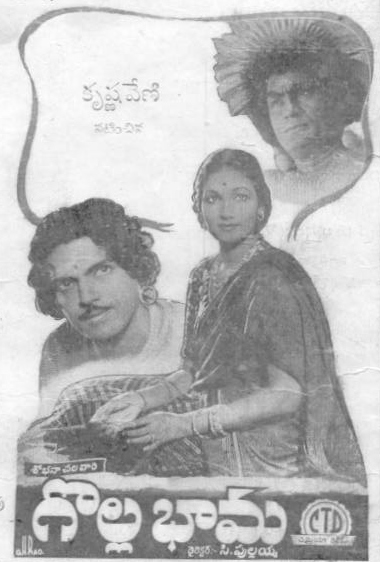
- Theatrical poster of Gollabhama
- Directed by: C. Pullayya
- Written by: Vempati Sadasivabrahmam (Dialogues) (Songs)
- Based on: Kaasi Majili Kathalu by Madhira Subbanna Deekshitulu
- Produced by: Mirzapuram Raja
- Starring: Krishnaveni; Eelapata Raghuramaiah; Anjali Devi
- Cinematography: D. S. Kotnis
- Edited by: R. M. Venugopal
- Music by: S. Hanumantha Rao; S. B. Dinkar Rao
- Production company: Sobhanachala Pictures
- Distributed by: Chamria Talkies
- Release date: February 22, 1947
- Running time: 125 minutes
- Country: India
- Language: Telugu

Gollabhama is a 1947 Indian Telugu-language swashbuckler film directed by C. Pullayya. Krishnaveni and Raghuramaiah played pivotol roles in the film. The film is produced by Mirzapuram Raja through Sobhanachala Pictures. The film is based on the stories of Kasi Majili Kathalu written in Telugu by Madhira Subbanna Deekshitulu. It was released on 22 February 1947. The film is known to be one of the earliest Telugu film to contain sequences in colour.

== Plot ==
On the way to Kasi, a guru named Manisiddhu tells stories to Gollagopanna. On the way to Onadu, the sculpture with the pot on the grasshopper's head and the prince next to it sees a poem there and asks for its story.

‘'నృపతి చంపితిన్, మగడు భూరిభుజంగము చేత చచ్చే నే

నాపద చెంది చెంది ఉదయార్కుని పట్టణమేగి, వేశ్యనై

పాపము కట్టుకొంటి, అట పట్టి విటుండైరాగచూసి, సం

తాపము చెంది అగ్ని పడి దగ్ధముగా కిటు గొల్లభామనై

రుూ పని కొప్పుకొంటి నృపతీ వగపేటికి చల్లచిందినన్’’ (written in Telugu)

Siddhu explained the story to Gopanna as follows. Maharaja Kamapala (AV Subbarao) of the Vikramapuri kingdom was a woman who looked for an opportunity to take on a gollapaduchu (Krishnaveni). One day he is going to rape her in the forest and she ends him with a sword in his side. The prince of another country (Raghuramaiah) saves her from the captive prince, takes her to his kingdom, marries her with the permission of her parents, teaching her all education, education, music, dance, sword fighting, etc. in the name of autonomy.

One day, seeing a couple wandering in the garden, Mohini (Anjalidevi) in heaven turns on the prince. The snake kills the prince and takes the body with him to heaven. She wants him to come to life and paint himself. Otherwise the prince promises to destroy his wife and clan, spend one night with his wife and surrender to her. Accordingly, a Rei spends time with his wife who has come to heaven, and in that bliss the elixir couple drinks there. No one would believe me when I told her the spontaneous, husband-to-be thing that came back to the queen world the next day. The Maharaja's command to kill her, who had been pregnant for some time, in the forest, so that she would not die due to consuming the elixir, and from there give birth to Babu in a cocoon, and he stays away for 18 years in the house of a prostitute in the town of Udayarkuni. Her son grows up to be the prince of that country. As her form does not diminish, Swayamprabha finds her son who has gone to meet Swayamprabha, and from there she goes there, burns herself in the forest and is sheltered by a heron. Mohini in heaven, the rape drug applied to the prince does not work for a few years, and the prince sends Mohini to earth on fire. The prince arrives at his parents, reveals the truth about his wife, begins a search for her and travels the kingdoms to the village where she lives. The film ends with Bhupathi Bhupathi narrating her story in verse to the prince, who sees her laughing, and her husband, who heard it, finds out the truth and her son, who has just arrived, finds out the truth.

== Cast ==
- Krishnaveni as Swayamprabha
- Raghuramaiah as Prince
- Anjali Devi as Mohini
- Dasari Kotirathnam
- Sriranjani Jr. as Devakanya
- Relangi as Friend of Prince
- Anjani Bai
- Sundaramma
- Gangaratnam as Vesya
- R. Ramireddy
- Vellanki Venkateswarlu
- Teegala Venkateswarlu
- A .V. Subbarao as Kamapaludu
- Koteswara Rao
- Mallikarjuna Rao
- Kumpatla Subbaravu
- K. Ramamurthy
- K. V. Subbaravu
- Venkatapati Raju
- Krishnamurthy
- Lingam Subbaravu
- V. Lakshmikantham
- A. L. Narayana
- Chandrakala
- Anjali Kumari
- Narimani

== Production ==
This is the first film starring Anjali Devi. Initially a part was shot under the direction of R. S. Prakash, but for some reason it was put aside and the whole film was completed again under the direction of C. Pullayya. Dance choreography is performed by V. Raghavaiah. T. V. S. Sarma is the art director of the film.

After the next 20 years, in 1968, the film was remade as Bhama Vijayam starring N. T. Rama Rao and Devika under Shekhar Films banner. The director of the film is also C. Pullayya.

== Soundtrack ==
All lyrics are written by Vempati Sadasivabrahmam; all music is composed by S. Hanumantha Rao, S. B. Dinakar Rao.

Track list
No.	Title	Singer(s)	Length
1.	"Chandamama"	Raghuramayya, Krishnaveni	4:05
2.	"Ravoye Ravoye"	Krishnaveni	1:13
3.	"Prema Sudha"	Raghuramayya, Krishnaveni	2:34
4.	"Bhupati Chamipitini"	Raghuramayya, Krishnaveni	2:59
Total length:			10:51
