= Pataal Bhairavi =

- Theatrical release poster
- Directed by: K. Bapayya
- Written by: Kader Khan (dialogues); Indeevar (lyrics)
- Story by: P. Nagendra Rao
- Based on: Patala Bhairavi (1951) by Pingali
- Produced by: G. Hanumantha Rao; Krishna (Presents)
- Starring: Jeetendra; Jaya Prada
- Cinematography: V. S. R. Swamy
- Edited by: K. Gopal Rao
- Music by: Bappi Lahiri
- Production company: Padmalaya Studios
- Release date: 3 May 1985
- Running time: 149 minutes
- Country: India
- Language: Hindi

Pataal Bhairavi (transl. The goddess of the netherworld) is a 1985 Indian Hindi-language swashbuckling fantasy film, produced by G. Hanumantha Rao by Padmalaya Studios, presented by Krishna and directed by K. Bapayya. It stars Jeetendra, and Jaya Prada with music composed by Bappi Lahiri. The film is a remake of the Telugu film Patala Bhairavi (1951), starring N. T. Rama Rao, Malathi, S. V. Ranga Rao.

== Plot ==
Once upon a time, the kingdom, Ujjain, was ruled by Maharaj Vijay Singh, whose only heir is Princess Indumati / Indu. The queen Swaroopa Devi is Indu's step mother, and she wants to get Indu married with her (Swaroopa's) brother Vishwanath Chanchal. Ramu is a gardener in the kingdom, one day he wins a fighting contest in front of the Royal family and is given an award by Indu, Ramu is smitten by her beauty. Following this Ramu stops Vishwanath from coercing money out of common citizens, Vishwanath complains to his mom and has Ramu captured and brought to court, in court Ramu exposes Vishwanath and is released, Indu too now is smitten by Ramu. In the kingdom, wizard Husair aims to acquire supreme power in the universe Pataal Bhairavi which is in the form of a statuette which fulfills the wish of one holding it. However, to procure the statue it is essential to sacrifice a dashing and brave young man before the goddess. One night, Ramu surreptitiously goes to meet Indu at the palace, is seized, and summoned before Maharaj who proclaims the death penalty. However Indu pleads for his life and he is spared & freed, but Maharaj says that if he aspires to marry Indu, he must get wealthy and then ask for her hand. The wizard Husair through his spells discerns that Ramu is perfect for his sacrifice to gain the goddess's statue, he meets Ramu and entices him with wealth, telling him that he has a quest where he needs Ramu's help, and in return will make Ramu wealthy, Ramu agrees to join him. After an adventurous journey, they land therein, and Husair orders Ramu to conduct a holy bath in the nearby pond where he relieves the curse of Yaskankya who divulges Husair's foul play. Now, Ramu tricks & butchers Husair which makes the goddess gratified and grants her statuette to Ramu. Thus Ramu gains incredible riches with it and the Maharaj gives his blessings to the wedding. Parallelly, Husair is resurrected with the aid of his acolyte Sadajapa utilizing Sanjeevani. During the time of nuptials, Husair possesses Vishwanath and steals the statuette. Next, Husair abducts Indu, steals Ramu's wealth and backstabs Vishwanath as well. Then Ramu pledges to retrieve Indu and his fortune and proceeds to find Husain. Meanwhile, Husair pesters Indu to marry him which she declines. Hence, he captures Ramu before he locates his lair. Then, Husair coerces Indu by threatening to harm Ramu. Fortuitously, Ramu's friend Hanuman finds a magical Shal & Shoes with the aid of which he frees Ramu and shaves Husair's beard, in which Husain's powers resides. At last, Ramu kills Husair and returns to Ujjain with his treasures and Indu. Finally, the movie ends on a happy note with the marriage of Ramu & Indu

== Cast ==
- Jeetendra as Ramu
- Jaya Prada as Princess Indumati
- Dimple Kapadia as Yaskankya
- Pran as Maharaja Vijay Singh
- Amjad Khan as Vishwanath Chanchal
- Kader Khan as Mantrik Husair
- Asrani as Sadajappa
- Shakti Kapoor as Hanuman
- Bindu as Maharani Swaroopa Devi
- Nirupa Roy as Ramu's mother
- Viju Khote as Chanchal's attendant
- Prema Narayan as Nalini (Indumati's Attendant)
- Silk Smitha as Dancer
- Shoma Anand as Goddess Pataal Bhairavi
- Manik Irani as Bilkalma

== Soundtrack ==
Lyrics: Indeevar

Song	Singer	Raga
"Mehman Nazar Ki Ban Ja Ek Raat Ke Liye"	Kishore Kumar, Lata Mangeshkar	
"Jhanak Jhanak Jhanak Lehar Nache, Jiya Nache"	Kishore Kumar, Asha Bhosle	
"Jhum Jhumke Nacho Tum, Gao Geet Milan Ke"	Kishore Kumar, Asha Bhosle	
"Ek Bechara Phans Gaya"	K. J. Yesudas	
"Pyar Ke Liye" (Part 1)	K. J. Yesudas	
"Pyar Ke Liye" (Part 2)	K. J. Yesudas	
"Chumma Chumma"	Salma Agha	Shivaranjani
"Ek Dupatta, Do Do Mawaali"	S. Janaki	
