= Kasi Majili Kathalu =

Collection of stories by Madhira Subbanna Deekshitulu

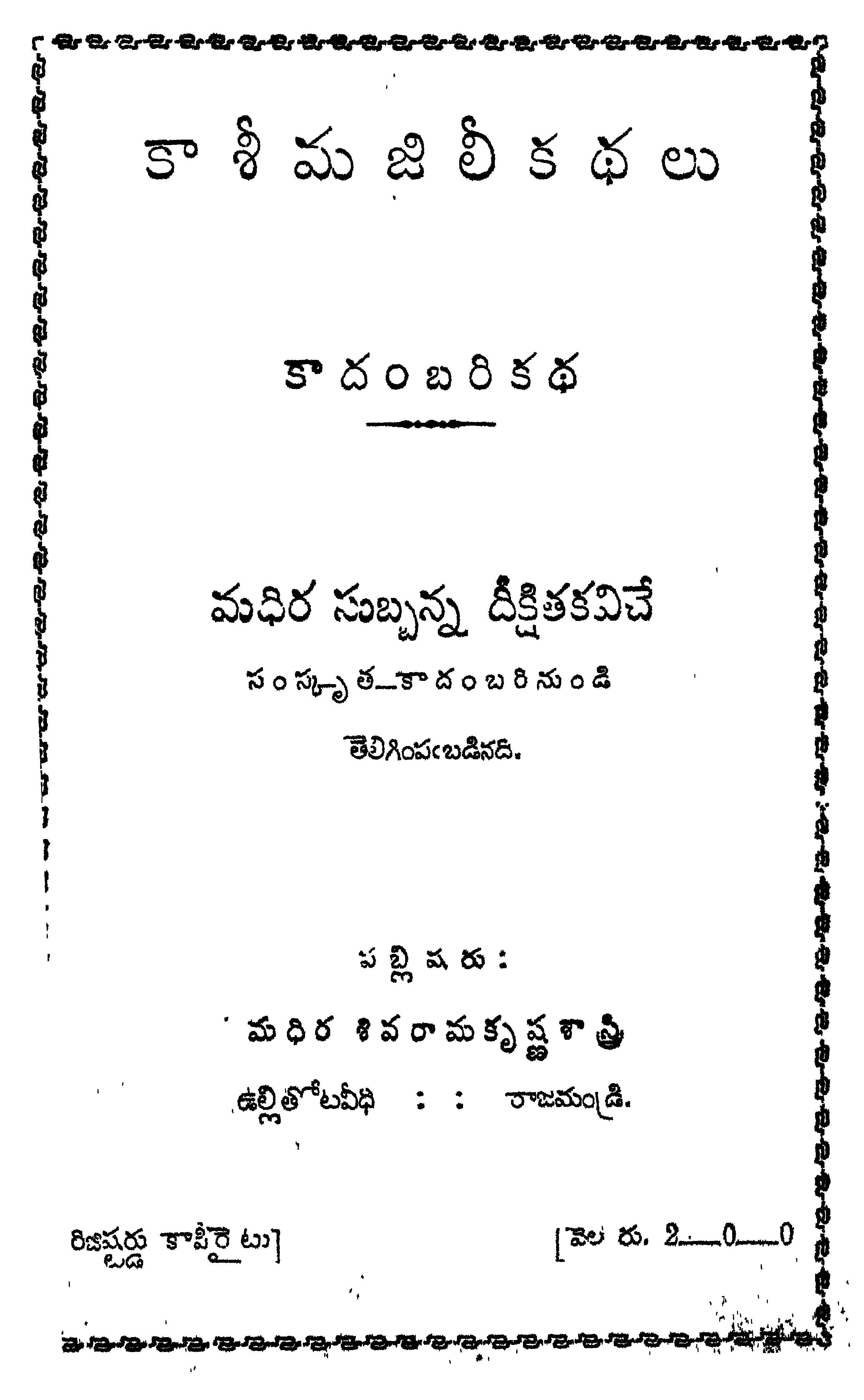
- Author: Madhira Subbanna Deekshitulu
- Language: Telugu
- Genre: Fiction, Moral tales
- Publication date: 1898
- Publication place: India
- Media type: Print
- Pages: Approx. 300 stories across 12 parts

Kasi Majili Kathalu is a collection of stories written by Madhira Subbanna Deekshitulu, first published in 1898. The work consists of 12 parts, weaving together tales told during a pilgrimage to the sacred city of Kasi (Varanasi), with a focus on moral lessons, fables, and anecdotes from mythology and history.

Several Telugu films have been adapted or inspired from the stories of Kasi Majili Kathalu.

== Background ==
The stories in Kasi Majili Kathalu are heavily inspired by Hindu mythology, regional folk tales, and historical anecdotes. Madhira Subbanna Deekshitulu crafted these tales to both entertain and impart moral teachings, making the collection an essential part of Telugu literary tradition.

== Plot ==
Kasi Majili Kathalu is a collection of stories centered around the journey of a learned Brahmin bachelor named Manisiddhudu, who sets out to travel to Kasi. Due to the challenging terrain, including rivers and mountains, and the lack of transportation facilities, he decides that having a companion would make the journey easier. Despite seeking several individuals, none agree to join him. Ultimately, Kotappa, an orphaned cowherd from the village of Srirangapuram, agrees to accompany him on the condition that he will entertain him with various stories along the way.

The journey of Manisiddhudu and Kotappa forms the core of the Kasi Majili Kathalu. As they travel together, they share numerous stories, covering a wide range of themes, including romance, love, desire, devotion, mythology, dharma, history, worldly knowledge, human nature, professions, pilgrimage, renunciation, and Vedanta. The tales provide a comprehensive exploration of human life and experiences, incorporating both entertainment and philosophical insights. The collection includes a multitude of interconnected stories, sub-stories, and chain narratives, offering readers both amusement and wisdom.

== Publication history ==
The first edition of Kasi Majili Kathalu was published in 1898, with ten parts completed by the author. The final two parts, including the story of Narada, were finished and the second edition was published in 1950 by Kondayya Sastriji, the son of Madhira Subbanna Dikshitakavi. The second edition was printed by Kandula Suryarao Brothers, Rajahmundry.

In 2005, Gollapudi Veeraswamy & Son republished Kasi Majili Kathalu with a revised edition aimed at modern readers. The original work, written in complex literary language, was reworked into simpler, colloquial language while retaining its essence. The edition, initially planned for release in 2004, was delayed and eventually published on Ugadi 2005, presenting the stories in simple, elegant prose.

== Themes ==
The Kasi Majili Kathalu collection comprises approximately 300 stories divided into 12 parts. These stories explore a variety of philosophical themes, including the significance of virtue, the repercussions of immoral actions, and the benefits of associating with virtuous individuals. The narratives also delve into topics such as leadership, politics, wisdom, and devotion, often drawing inspiration from Hindu mythology.

The collection features notable historical and mythological figures, including Sri Krishna Devaraya, Bhoja, Sankaracharya, Vikramaditya, and Narada. Key themes woven throughout the stories highlight the influence of virtuous women and the harm caused by malicious ones. They emphasize the advantages of forming righteous associations while warning against the perils of associating with wicked individuals. The importance of knowledge, governance, and diplomacy is frequently underscored, alongside lessons on devotion and the consequences of one's actions in a mythological context.

== Style ==
Kasi Majili Kathalu was written in a formal literary style (grandhikam) rather than colloquial language (vyavaharikam) to appeal to scholars and align with the preferences of the time. Grandhikam was also considered more suitable for portraying divine characters, where colloquial dialogue might be deemed inappropriate.

Works originally composed in colloquial language were often revised into formal styles to meet literary standards. Despite this, traces of colloquial expressions remained. Gurajada Apparao noted these elements in Kasi Majili Kathalu and provided examples. Evidence suggests the collection initially included colloquial elements, some of which are still evident.

The stories feature nearly 670 main characters, along with countless supporting characters like servants and attendants.

== Reception ==
Kasi Majili Kathalu gained widespread popularity in Telugu literature and continues to hold cultural relevance. The stories influenced many other writers in the region, with elements from the collection incorporated into other works. The tales were also adapted in children's magazines like Chandamama. Furthermore, the themes and narrative style of the collection influenced several Telugu films, which drew inspiration from the stories.

The collection received critical acclaim for its engaging storytelling, rich moral lessons, and the seamless blending of mythological and historical elements. The work's dramatic nature made it a favorite among readers of all ages. Its influence extended to other media, including adaptations for radio and television, where some stories were turned into serials for children.

== Film adaptations ==
Several Telugu films have been adapted from the stories of Kasi Majili Kathalu, with the following notable adaptations:

- Gollabhama (1947) – Uncredited
- Keelu Gurram (1949) – Uncredited
- Pathala Bhairavi (1951) – Uncredited
- Navvithe Navaratnalu (1951) – Uncredited
- Sahasra Siracheda Apoorva Chinthamani (1960) – Uncredited
- Gulebakavali Katha (1962) – Uncredited
