= Keelu Gurram =

- Theatrical release poster
- Directed by: Raja Saheb of Mirzapur
- Written by: Story/Script/Songs: Tapi Dharma Rao; Sadasivabrahmam (uncredited); Screenplay: Ch Narayana Murthy
- Produced by: Raja Saheb of Mirzapur
- Starring: Akkineni Nageswara Rao; Anjali Devi
- Cinematography: D. L. Narayana
- Edited by: R. M. Venu Gopal
- Music by: Ghantasala
- Production company: Sobhanachala Pictures
- Release date: 19 February 1949
- Running time: 172 minutes
- Country: India
- Language: Telugu

Keelu Gurram (transl. Magical horse) is a 1949 Indian Telugu-language swashbuckler film produced and directed by Raja Saheb of Mirzapuram under the Sobhanachala Pictures banner. It stars Akkineni Nageswara Rao and Anjali Devi, with music composed by Ghantasala. The film marks the debut of Ghantasala as a composer who would later become a noted composer and playback singer.

Fascinated by the commercial success of folklore films, Raja of Mirzapuram asked his writers to come up with a similar subject. Tapi Dharma Rao assisted by the noted story-teller Sadasivabrahmam (uncredited) wrote the story of the film which is inspired by Kasi Majili Kathalu. Chitrapu Narayanamurthy, who had earlier directed all of Raja's productions wrote the screenplay. Narayanamurthy also ghost directed most of the scenes for the Raja.

The film was released on 19 February 1949. Keelu Gurram was an Industry Hit and celebrated a 148-day run at Maruthi Talkies in Vijayawada and hundred-day run at 10 other centres. It was also the first Telugu film dubbed into Tamil. After Balaraju (1948), Keelugurram established Nageswara Rao as the much sought-after hero.

== Cast ==
- Akkineni Nageswara Rao as Vikrama
- Anjali Devi as Guna Sundari, a Yakshini
- A. V. Subba Rao as Prachanda Maharaju
- Relangi as Govindudu
- D. Satyanarayana as Mahamantri Sumantha
- V. Koteswara Rao as Pratapa Shilpa
- Pucha Viswanatham as Vasudeva
- K. V. Manikya Rao Naidu as Sishya
- M. Kondayya as Rudra
- Ramanatha Sastry as Maharaju
- Suryashree as Vidyavathi
- Balamani as Prabhavathi
- Lakshmirajyam Jr. as Sugunavathi
- T. Kanakam as Keekini
- Surabhi Kamalabai

== Soundtrack ==
Keelu Gurram

Film score by Ghantasala
- Released: 1949
- Genre: Soundtrack
- Length: 28:21
- Label: His Master's Voice
- Producer: Ghantasala

Music was composed by Ghantasala. Lyrics were written by Tapi Dharma Rao. Music released on His Master's Voice.

| S. No. | Song title | Singers | length |
|---|---|---|---|
| 1 | "Aaha Aho Anandam" | V. Sarala Rao | 2:39 |
| 2 | "Bhaagyamu Naadenoyi" | Krishna Veni | 2:04 |
| 3 | "Choochi Teeravakada" | Krishna Veni | 3:07 |
| 4 | "Kaadusuma Kala Kaadusuma" | Ghantasala, V. Sarala Rao | 2:54 |
| 5 | "Evaru Chesina Karma" | Ghantasala | 3:26 |
| 6 | "Yenta Krupamative" | Ghantasala, V. Sarala Rao | 2:24 |
| 7 | "Mohanamaha" | Krishna Veni | 3:47 |
| 8 | "Sobhana Giri Nilaya" | Krishna Veni | 2:47 |
| 9 | "Teliyavasama Palukatarama" | Ghantasala, Krishna Veni | 2:38 |
| 10 | "Nera Nera Bandi" | Ghantasala | 2:35 |
| 11 | "Amma Kavumammu Aadi Shakti Shankari" | P. Leela | 2:18 |
| 12 | "Dikku Teliyaddu Eemisetu Deva Deva" | P.Leela | 2:34 |
| 13 | "Mamu Bravave Maata Tulasi Jagadamba" | P.Leela | 2:22 |
| 14 | "Nidurabo Nayanna Nidurabo Na Chinnaa" | P.Leela | 3:13 |

== Box office ==
- The film ran for more than 100 days in 11 centers in Andhra Pradesh.
