= Journal of Astronomical History and Heritage =

- Discipline: History of astronomy
- Language: English
- Edited by: Wayne Orchiston

Publication details
- History: 1998–present
- Publisher: University of Science and Technology of China (China)
- Frequency: Quarterly
- Impact factor: 0.94 (2022)

Standard abbreviations
- ISO 4: J. Astron. Hist. Herit.

Indexing
- ISSN: 1440-2807
- LCCN: sn98031840
- OCLC no.: 817901222

Links
- Journal homepage

The Journal of Astronomical History and Heritage is a peer-reviewed academic journal. As of 2021, the journal is published four times per year and is logged through the Astrophysics Data System. It publishes research papers, reviews, short communications, IAU reports, and book reviews on all aspects of astronomical history.

The co-editor-in-chief are Wayne Orchiston and Yunli Shi. As of 2024 the associate editors are Clifford Cunningham, Richard de Grijs, Duane Hamacher, James Lequeux, Mohammad Mozaffari, and Peter Robertson. The journal is registered with Scopus and has a 2022 impact factor of 0.94.

It was established in 1998 by John Louis Perdrix, after the Australian Journal of Astronomy was discontinued. Until 2005, it was published by Astral Press, a publishing house founded and owned by Perdrix.

From 2005-2012 it was published by the Centre for Astronomy (James Cook University). From 2013-2021 it was published by the National Astronomical Research Institute of Thailand. and then through Rizal Technological University. It is now published by the University of Science and Technology of China. All papers are published electronically and all papers from 1998 to the present can be accessed through the journal's website.
