= Krishnaveni (actress) =

Indian Telugu actress and singer (1924–2025)

Chittajallu Krishnaveni
- Born: 24 December 1924; Pangidi, Madras Presidency, British India (now in Andhra Pradesh, India)
- Died: 16 February 2025 (aged 100); Hyderabad, Telangana, India
- Occupations: Actress; singer; producer
- Spouse: Mirzapuram Raja (m. 1939; died 1974)
- Children: 1

Chittajallu Krishnaveni (24 December 1924 – 16 February 2025), also known as C. Krishnaveni or simply Krishnaveni, was an Indian actress, producer and playback singer who worked in Telugu cinema. She was awarded the Raghupathi Venkaiah Award by the Government of Andhra Pradesh.

== Life and career ==
Krishnaveni hailed from Pangidi, West Godavari district, Andhra Pradesh, India. She was a drama artist before entering the film industry.

She was remembered for introducing several stalwart film personalities in her Telugu film Mana Desam (1949) as a producer. They included N T Rama Rao as actor, Ghantasala Venkateswara Rao as music director, P Leela as playback singer among others. Mana Desam was based on the Bengali novel Vipradas.

Krishnaveni died at her residence in Film Nagar, Hyderabad, India, on 16 February 2025, at the age of 100.

== Filmography ==
=== As actress ===
| Year | Title | Role | Notes |
|---|---|---|---|
| 1935 | Sati Anasuya | | |
| 1937 | Mohini Rukmangada | | |
| 1938 | Kacha Devayani | | |
| 1939 | Malli Pelli | Annapoorna | |
| 1939 | Mahananda | | |
| 1940 | Jeevan Jyothi | | |
| 1941 | Dakshayagnam | | |
| 1942 | Bhakta Prahlada | | |
| 1944 | Bhishma | | |
| 1947 | Brahma Ratham | | |
| 1947 | Gollabhama | Swayamprabha | |
| 1948 | Madalasa | | |
| 1948 | Kaamavalli | | Tamil film |
| 1949 | Mana Desam | | Also producer |
| 1949 | Dharmangada | | |
| 1950 | Lakshmamma | | |
| 1950 | Aahuti | | |
| 1950 | Thirugubatu | | |
| 1951 | Perantalu | | |

=== As producer ===
- Bhakta Prahlada (1942)
- Mana Desam (1949)
- Lakshmamma
- Dampatyam

== Discography ==
=== As singer ===
- Keelu Gurram (1949)
- Bala Mitrula Katha (1972)
