= Mana Desam =

- Theatrical release poster
- Directed by: L. V. Prasad
- Written by: Samudrala Sr. (dialogues)
- Screenplay by: L. V. Prasad
- Based on: Vipradas by Sarat Chandra Chattopadhyay
- Produced by: Raja Saheb of Mirzapur; Krishnaveni (Presents)
- Starring: V. Nagayya; C. H. Narayana Rao; Krishnaveni
- Cinematography: M. A. Rehman
- Edited by: M. V. Rajan
- Music by: Ghantasala
- Production company: Sobhanachala Pictures
- Release date: 24 November 1949
- Running time: 172 minutes
- Country: India
- Language: Telugu

Mana Desam (transl. Our Country) is a 1949 Indian Telugu-language drama film directed by L. V. Prasad. It was produced by Raja Saheb of Mirzapur under the Sobhanachala Pictures banner, and presented by Krishnaveni. It stars V. Nagayya, C. H. Narayana Rao and Krishnaveni, with music composed by Ghantasala. The film is the debut of actor N. T. Rama Rao in the film industry. It is based on the Bengali novel Vipradas by Sarat Chandra Chattopadhyay, and is set against the backdrop of the Indian independence movement.

== Cast ==
- V. Nagayya as Ramnath
- C. H. Narayana Rao as Madhu
- Krishnaveni as Sobha
- N. T. Rama Rao as British Inspector
- Relangi as Constable No: 144
- Vangara as Nandayya
- Ramanatha Sastry as Barrister (Sobha's father and Janaki's uncle)
- Surabhi Bala Saraswati as Sobha's friend
- Kanchan as Janaki
- Hemalatha as Yasodha
- Lakshmikantham as Narsi
- Master Vijay Shankar as Nehru

== Soundtrack ==
The film's soundtrack is composed by Ghantasala.

- "Jaya Janani" – patriotic song, singers are Ghantasala and C. Krishnaveni
- "Emito Ee Sambhandam Enduko Ee Anubhandam" – duet, singers are M. S. Ramarao and C. Krishnaveni
- "Chalo Chalo Raja" – Singers are M. S. Ramarao and C. Krishnaveni
- "Ninnu Nenu Maruvalenura Police Yenkatsami" – rural style song, singer is Jikki Krishnaveni
- "Atta leni Kodalu Uttamuralu" – folklore song. singer is C. Kirshnaveni
- "Vedalipo Tella Dora Vedalipo" – patriotic group song..Ghantasala and C. Krishnaveni & Group.
- "Nirvedamela Kanneridela" – Gandian song by Nagayya
- "O Bharata Yuvaka" – patriotic group song..Ghantasala & Group.
- "Kallo Ninnu CHoosinane Pilla Vallu Jallumannade" – duet, singers are Ghantasala and C. Krishnaveni
- "Vaishnava Janato" – Traditional Bhajan.. Ghantasala.
