= Atri =

Sage in Hinduism

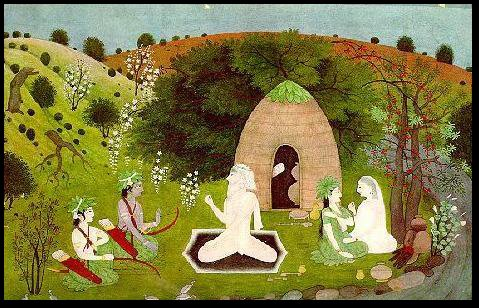
- Rama visiting Atri's hermitage. As Atri talks to Rama and his brother Lakshmana, Anusuya talks with his wife Sita
- Affiliation: Brahmarshi

Genealogy
- Parents: Brahma (father)
- Spouse: Anasuya
- Children: Durvasa, Chandra and Dattatreya

Atri or Attri is a Vedic sage, who is credited with composing numerous shlokas to Agni, Indra, and other Vedic deities of Hinduism. Atri is one of the Saptarishi (seven great Vedic sages) in the Hindu tradition, and the one most mentioned in the Rigveda.

The fifth Mandala (Book 5) of the Rigveda is called the Atri Mandala in his honour, and the eighty seven shlokas in it are attributed to him and his descendants.

Atri is also mentioned in the Puranas and the Hindu epics of the Ramayana and the Mahabharata.

== Legend ==
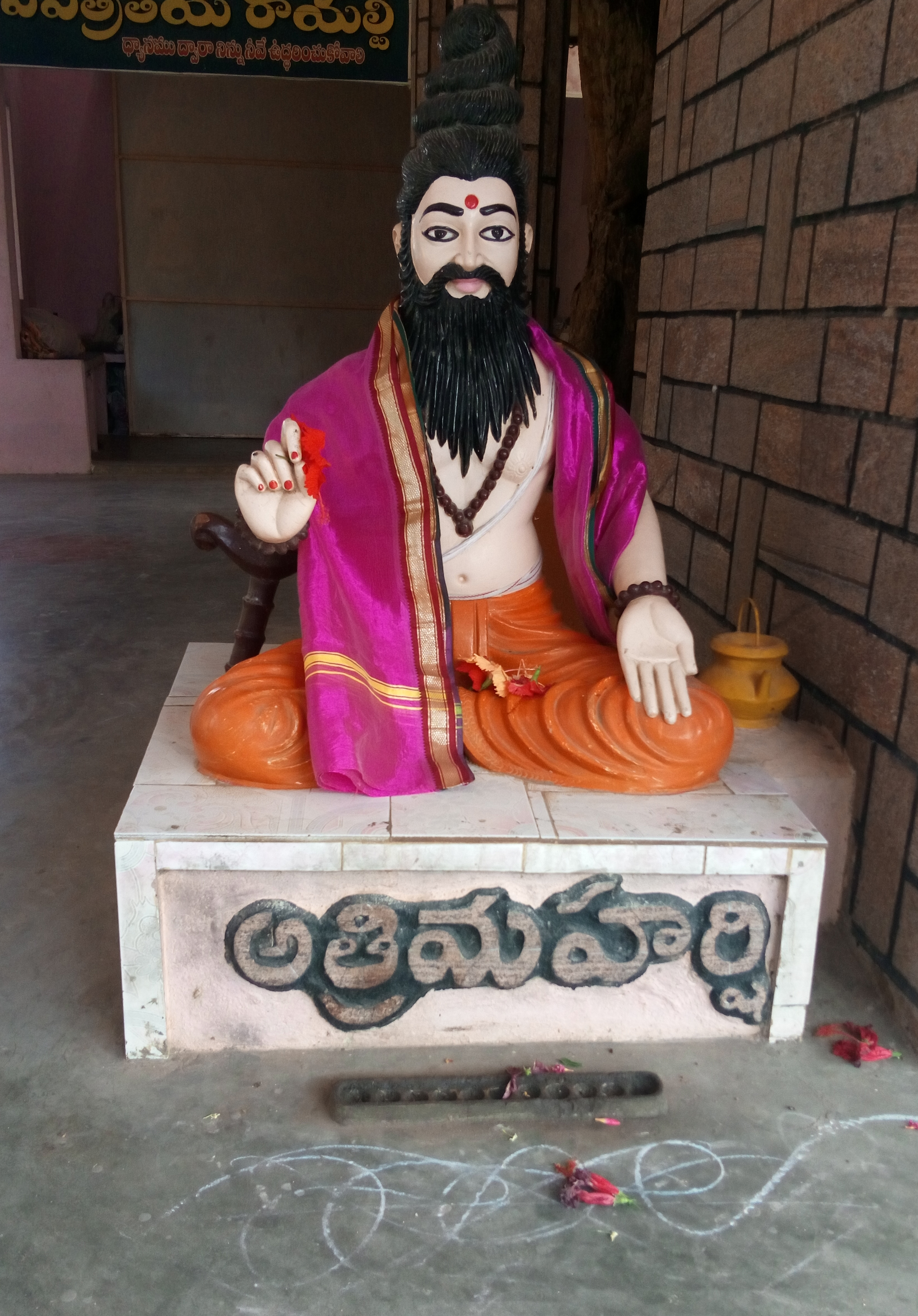
Atri statue at Atreyapuram village of AP.

Atri is one of the seven great rishis (saptarshi) of the current Vaivasvata manvantara, along with Agastya, Bhardwaja, Gautama, Jamadagni, Vashistha, and Vishvamitra. Atri is a mānasputra, one who is born from the mind of Brahma. The Brihadaranyaka Upanishad elaborates that each of the satparshis symbolize one sense or organ of Brahma. Atri symbolizes the tongue, which emphasizes his wisdom and knowledge of the Vedas.

According to legends of the Vedic era, Atri was married to Anasuya Devi, who is considered to be one of the seven female pativratas. They had three sons: Dattatreya, Durvasa, and Chandra. According to the Bhagavada Purana, when instructed by Brahma to contribute to the world's creation, Atri, along with Anusuya, performed severe austerities (tapas) on the Riksha mountain range. Pleased by their devotion and prayers, the Hindu trinity (Brahma, Vishnu, and Shiva) appeared before the couple and offered them boons. Atri prayed to all three to be born to them. Chandra was born as an ansha (part) of Brahma, Dattatreya was born as an ansha of Vishnu, and Durvasa was born as an ansha of Shiva. Another version of the legend states that Anasuya, by the powers of her chastity, rescued the three gods, and in return, they were born to her as children.

Atri is mentioned in various scriptures, the Rig Veda being the most notable. He is also associated with various ages, such as the Treta Yuga during the Ramayana, when he and Anasuya advised Rama and his wife Sita. The pair is also attributed to bringing river Ganga down to earth, as mentioned in the Shiva Purana.

He is said to have been a resident of the south, according to the Valmiki Ramayana. Puranic tradition supports this as well.

== Seer of Rig Veda ==
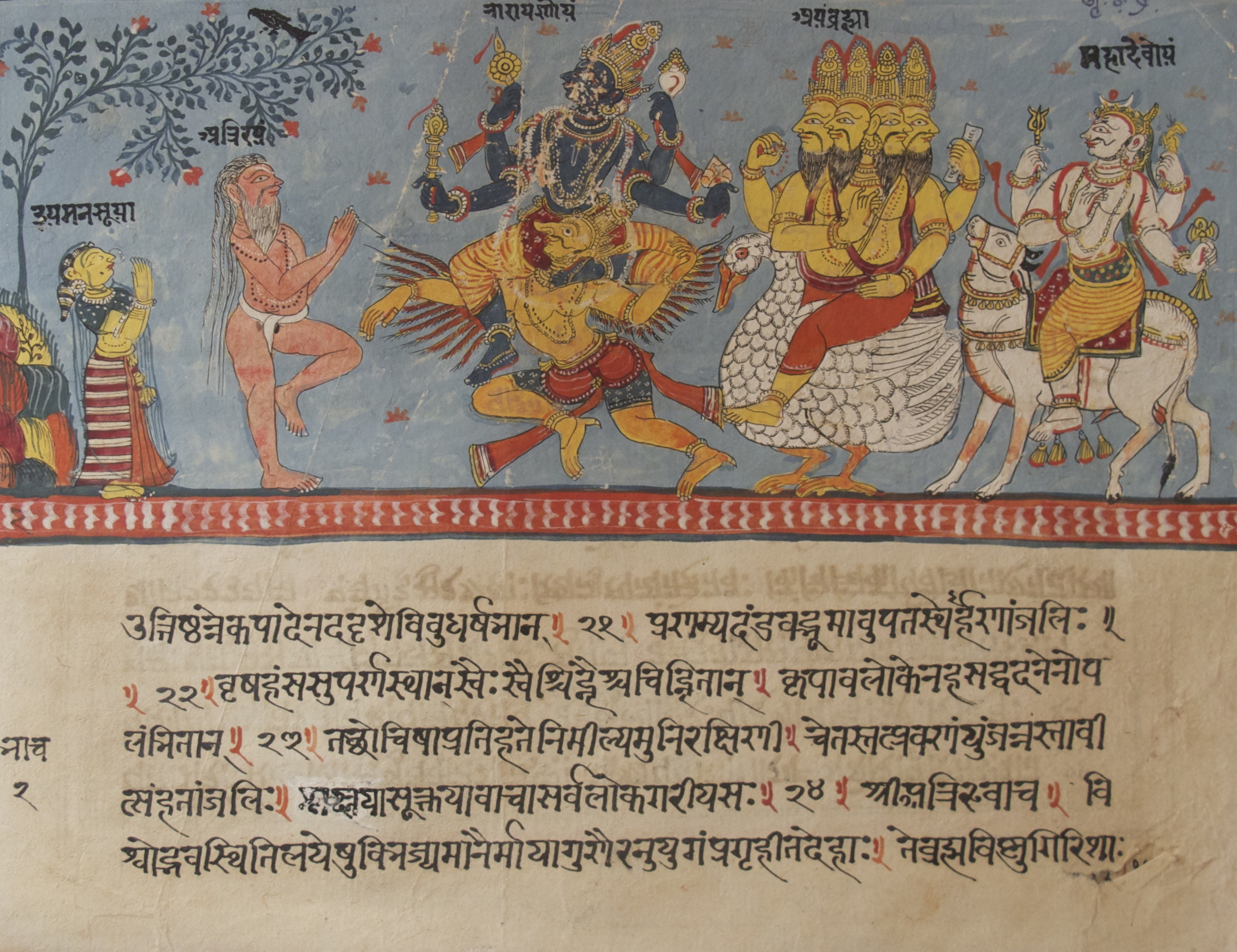
A Bhagavata Purana manuscript page depicting the story of Atri and Anasuya meeting the Trimurti (PhP 4.1.21–25) (paper, late 18th century, Jaipur)

He is the seer of the fifth Mandala (Book 5) of the Rigveda. Atri had many sons and disciples who have also contributed in the compilation of the Rig Veda and other Vedic texts. Mandala 5 comprises 87 shlokas, mainly to Agni and Indra, but also to the Visvedevas ("all the gods'), the Maruts, the twin-deity Mitra-Varuna and the Asvins. Two shlokas each are dedicated to Ushas (the dawn) and to Savitr. Most shlokas in this book are attributed to the Atri clan composers, called the Atreyas.

The Atri shlokas of the Rigveda are significant for their melodic structure as well as for featuring spiritual ideas in the form of riddles. These shlokas include lexical, syntactic, morphological and verb play utilizing the flexibility of the Sanskrit language. The shloka 5.44 of the Rigveda in Atri Mandala is considered by scholars such as Geldner to be the most difficult riddle shloka in all of the Rigveda. The verses are also known for their elegant presentation of natural phenomenon through divinely inspired poems, such as poetically presenting dawn as a cheerful woman in shloka 5.80.

While the fifth mandala is attributed to Atri and his associates, sage Atri is mentioned or credited with numerous other verses of the Rigveda in other Mandalas, such as 10.137.4.

== Ramayana ==
In the Ramayana, Rama, Sita, and Lakshmana visit the hermitage of Atri and Anasuya during their fourteen-year exile in the forest. Atri's hut is described to be in Chitrakuta, near a lake with divine music and songs, the water loaded with flowers, green water leaves, and with many "cranes, fisherbirds, floating tortoises, swans, frogs and pink geese." During the visit, Anusuya tells Sita to ask for a boon. However, Sita does not wish for anything, so Anusuya gives her a "precious robe" made of "heavenly fabric, rich and rare" as well as some pure and heavenly ornaments.

== Puranas ==
A number of sages named Atri are mentioned in the various medieval era Puranas. The legends therein about Atri are diverse and inconsistent. It is unclear if these refer to the same person, or to different Rishis who had the same name.

== Cultural influence ==
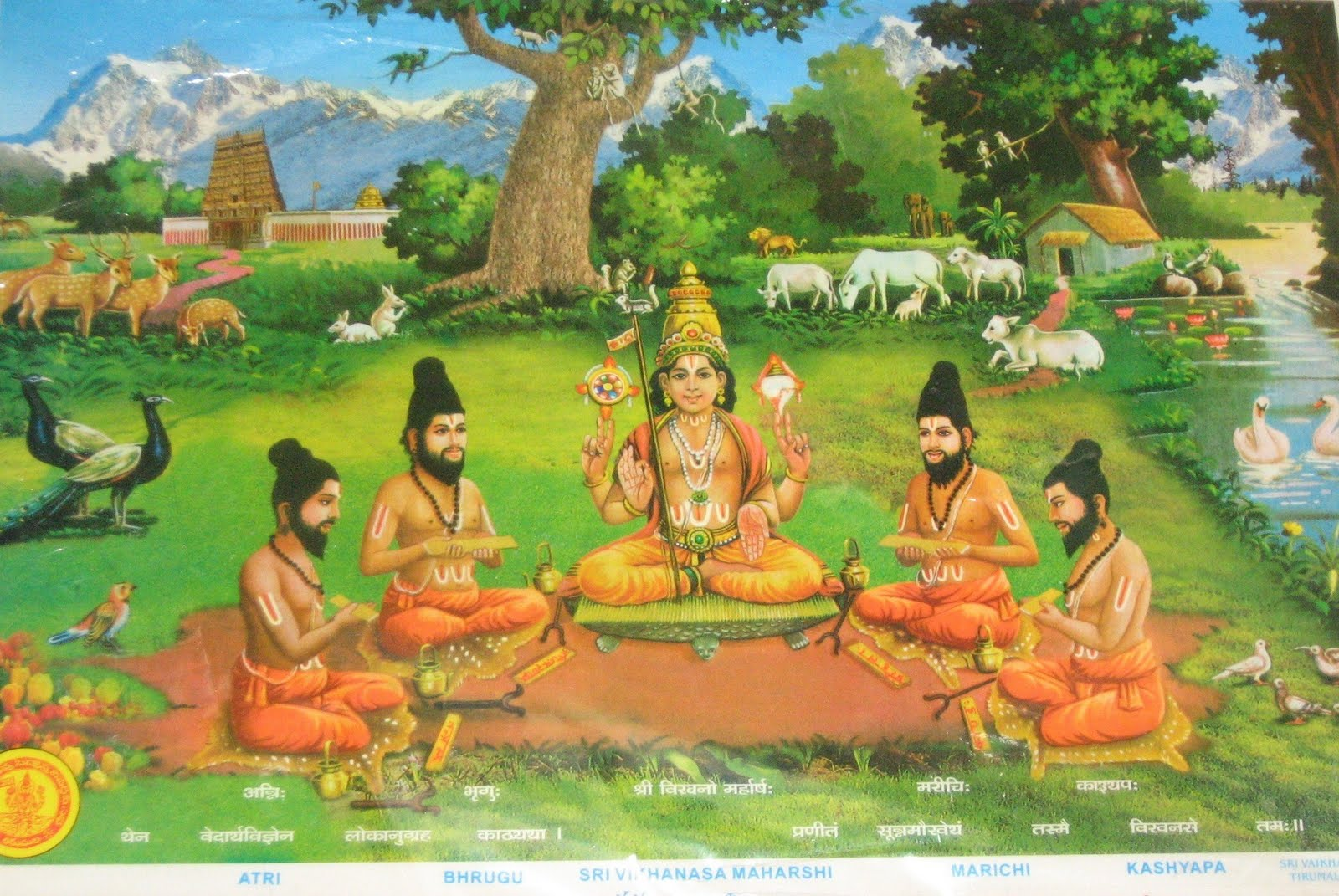
Left to right: Atri, Bhrigu, Vikhanasa, Marichi and Kashyapa.

The Vaikhanasas sub-tradition within Vaishnavism found in South India near Tirupati, credit their theology to four Rishis (sages), namely Atri, Marichi, Bhrigu and Kashyapa. One of the ancient texts of this tradition is Atri Samhita, which survives in highly inconsistent fragments of manuscripts. The text are rules of conduct aimed at Brahmins of the Vaikhanasas tradition. The surviving parts of the Atri Samhita suggest that the text discussed, among other things, yoga, and ethics of living, with precepts such as:

Self restraint:

- If material or spiritual pain is created by others, and one is not offended and does not wreak revenge, it is called Dama.

Charity:

- Even with limited income, something should be given away daily with care and liberal spirit. This is called Dana.

Compassion:

- One should behave like his own self, towards others, his own relations and friends, him who envies him, and even his enemy. This is called Daya.

— Atri Samhita, Translated by MN Dutt

The Vaikhanasas continue to be a significant community in South India, and they adhere to their Vedic heritage.

== See also ==
- Abhyasa
- Atri's Eclipse
- List of Indian philosophers
- Bhartrihari

== Sources ==
- Anthony, David W. (2007), The Horse The Wheel And Language. How Bronze-Age Riders From the Eurasian Steppes Shaped The Modern World, Princeton University Press
- Flood, Gavin D. (1996), An Introduction to Hinduism, Cambridge University Press
- Kambhampati, Parvathi Kumar (2000). Sri Dattatreya (First ed.). Visakhapatnam: Dhanishta.
- Rigopoulos, Antonio (1998). Dattatreya: The Immortal Guru, Yogin, and Avatara. New York: State University of New York Press. ISBN 0-7914-3696-9
- Witzel, Michael (1995), "Early Sanskritization: Origin and Development of the Kuru state" (PDF), EJVS, 1 (4), archived from the original (PDF) on 20 February 2012
