= Riksha Mountains =

Mountain range described in the Mahabharata

Riksha Mountains is a mountain range described in the epic Mahabharata. It is identified to be part of the mountain ranges in the central India. It is mentioned in the military campaigns of Pandava general Bhima.
