= Madhira Subbanna Deekshitulu =

Indian writer and poet (1868–1928)

Madhira Subbanna Dikshitulu
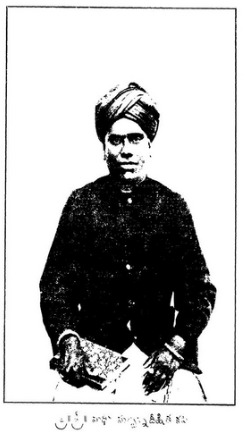
- Native name: మధిర సుబ్బన్న దీక్షితులు
- Born: 1868; Tallapudi, West Godavari district, Andhra Pradesh, India
- Died: 1928
- Occupation: Writer, poet
- Language: Telugu
- Genres: Fiction, poetry
- Notable works: Kasi Majili Kathalu
- Parents: Somidevamma (mother), Kondayya (father)

Madhira Subbanna Dikshitulu (1868–1928) was an Indian writer and poet known for his contributions to Telugu literature, especially through Kasi Majili Kathalu. His stories combined entertainment with moral and philosophical themes.

Kasi Majili Kathalu is a 12-part Telugu story series recognised for its humour and engaging narratives. It has also inspired adaptations in Telugu cinema.

== Early life and education ==
Madhira Subbanna Dikshitulu was born in Tallapudi, West Godavari district into a Velanati Vaidiki family to Somidevamma and Kondayya. He received his education under Ivaturi Nagalinga Sastri.

== Career ==
Subbanna Dikshitulu initially gained recognition as an Ashtavadhani, excelling in the traditional art of composing poetry on multiple topics simultaneously. By 1888, he had gained recognition as a skilled poet in Telugu and Sanskrit. However, he later shifted his focus to storytelling, which marked a significant phase in his career.

In 1898, he published Kasi Majili Kathalu, a collection of stories that explored diverse themes, including virtue, morality, and human behaviour. These stories were widely appreciated for their engaging narratives, appealing to a broad audience and influencing early Telugu prose literature.

The narrative style of Kasi Majili Kathalu influenced many writers, leading to the development of similar story collections and contributing to the growth of serialized storytelling in Telugu literature.
