= Anasuya =

Wife of Sage Atri in Hinduism

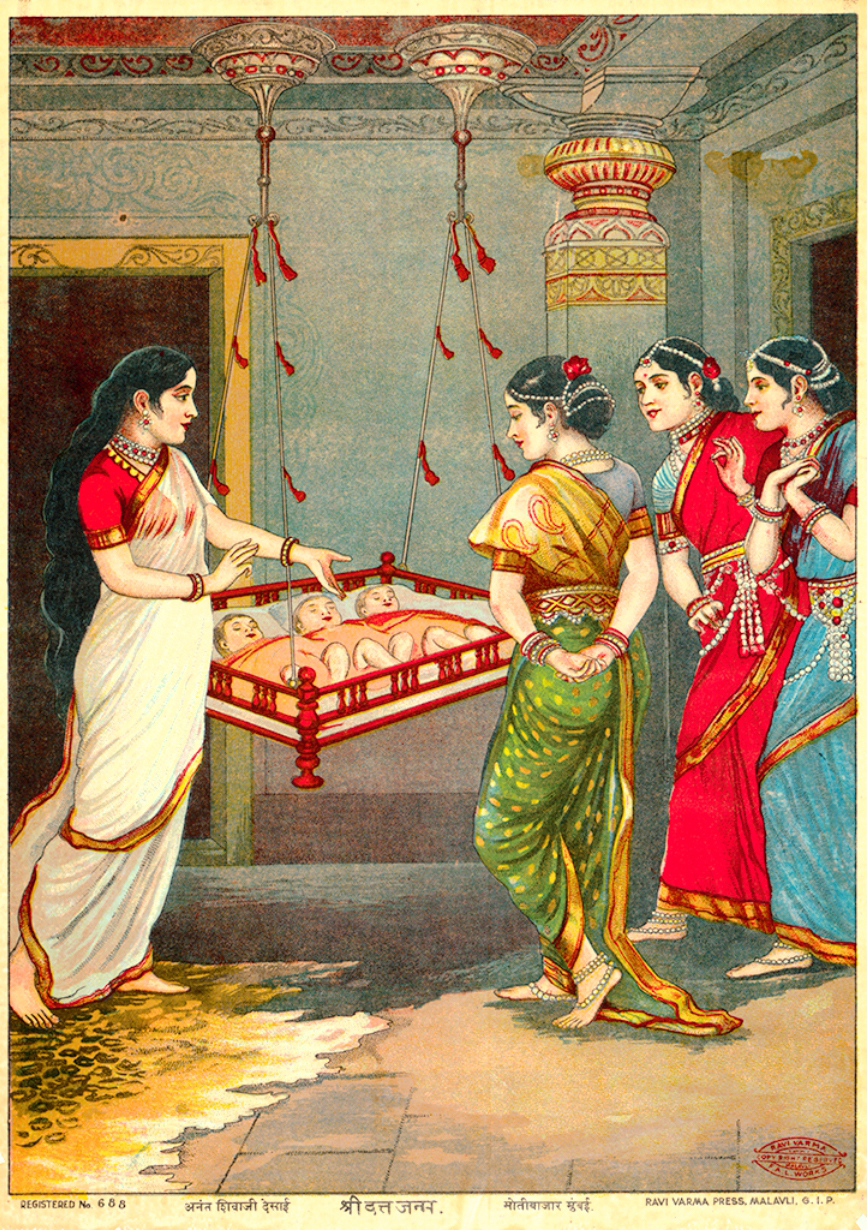
- Anasuya explains to the Tridevi that the Trimurti had been turned into infants. This lithograph by Raja Ravi Varma Press depicts one version of the legend in which the Trimurti merge and turn into Anasuya's three-headed son, Dattatreya.
- Texts: Ramayana, Puranas

Genealogy
- Parents: Devahuti (mother); Kardama (father)
- Spouse: Atri
- Children: Dattatreya; Chandra; Durvasa; Shubhatreyi (Brahma Purana)

Anasuya (Sanskrit: अनसूया, romanized: Anasūyā, lit. 'free from envy and malice') is an ascetic, and the wife of Sage Atri in Hinduism. She is the daughter of Devahuti and the Prajapati Kardama in Hindu texts. In the Ramayana, she lives with her husband in a small hermitage on the southern border of the Chitrakuta forest. A pious woman who leads an austere life, she is described as having miraculous powers.

Anasuya is the sister of the sage Kapila, who also served as her teacher. She becomes the mother of Dattatreya, the sage-avatar of Vishnu, Chandra, a form of Brahma, and Durvasa, the irascible sage avatar of Shiva. When Sita and Rama visit her during their exile, Anasuya is very attentive to them, giving the former an unguent that would maintain her beauty forever.

== Etymology ==
Anasuya is composed of two Sanskrit words: ana and asūya, translating to the 'one who is free from jealousy or envy'.

== Story ==
=== Origin ===
The genealogy of Anasuya and her family is mentioned in the third book of the Bhagavata Purana. The Prajapati Kardama marries Devahuti, the daughter of the Svayambhu Manu. They are described to have ten children, a son named Kapila, and nine daughters, including Anasuya. Each daughter is married to a rishi; Anasuya is married to Atri.

=== Restoring the sunrise ===
According to a legend from the Markandeya Purana, a Brahmin named Kaushika from Pratishthana used to visit a prostitute, despite having a devoted wife, named Shandili, or Shilavati, or Sumati in some versions. When he is unable to pay her for her services, the prostitute stops seeing him, forcing him to return to his wife, who still cares for him. As he still longs for the affection of the prostitute, he asks his wife to take him to her.

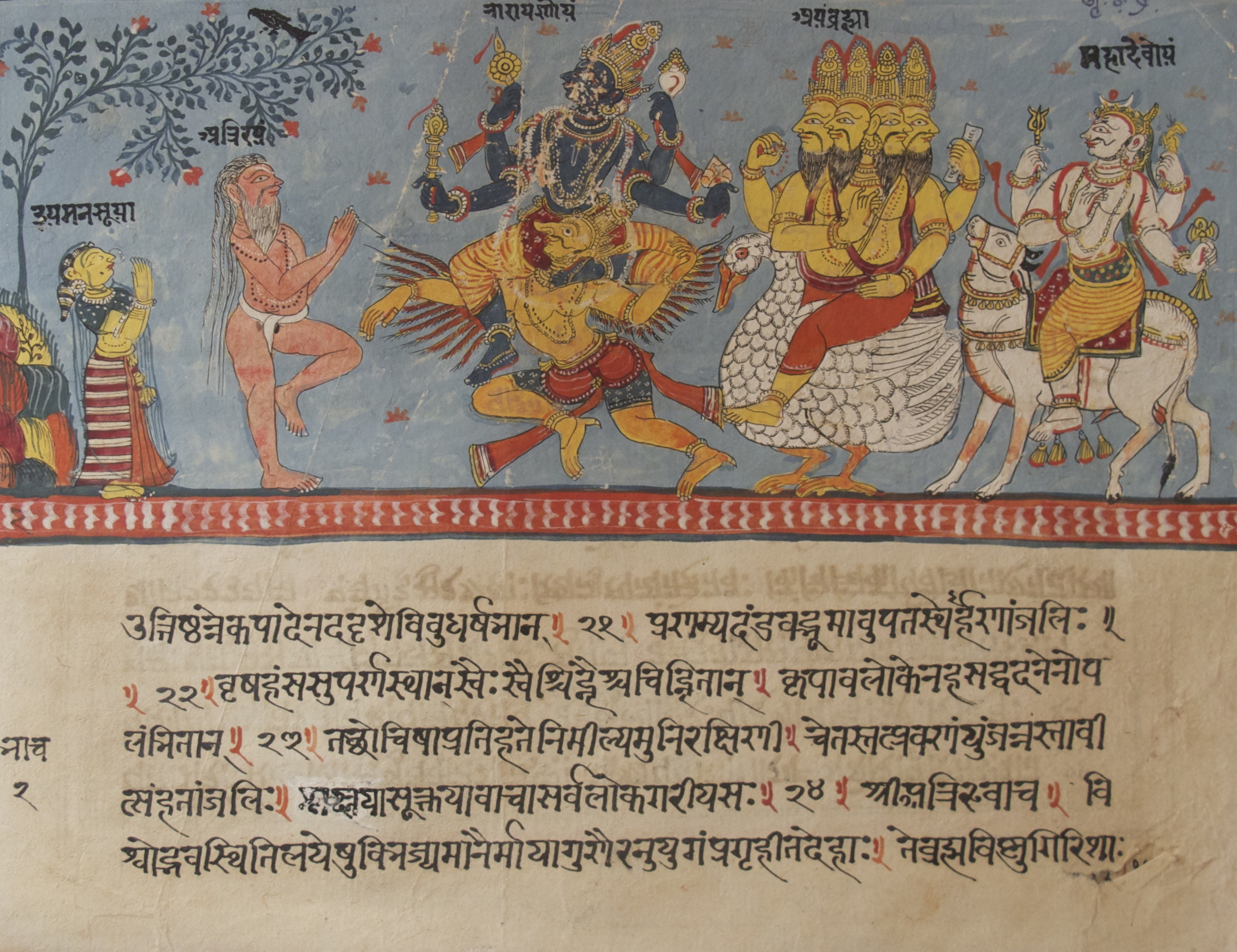
A Bhagavata Purana manuscript page depicting the story of Atri and Anasuya meeting the Trimurti (PhP 4.1.21–25) (paper, late 18th century, Jaipur)

The sage Mandavya had been impaled in lieu of a crime and was lying on a spike in the forest, still alive due to his yogic powers. While being led by his wife through the deep forest at night, Kaushika, mistaking the sage for a thief, pushes him. Furious, Mandavya curses him to die before the next sunrise. To stop this curse from fruition, Shandili appeals to the solar deity, Surya, to not rise the next dawn. Surya acquiesces to the appeal of Shandili, as she is an extremely chaste and devoted woman. This leads to chaos in the universe, the deities not receiving their oblations, rainfall not occurring, grain not being cultivated, and people not performing their customary Vedic rituals. The deities go to Brahma, who suggests that they propitiate Anasuya, who was in the process of performing a great tapas with her husband.

Accordingly, the divinities go to Anasuya, and the kind-hearted woman agrees to help them. Anasuya meets Shandili, and the two women engage in a conversation. Anasuya explains to Shandili that the entire universe is in peril because of her appeal to Surya, and discusses the necessity of a woman's devotion to her husband. Anasuya promises the woman that Kaushika would be free of his curse, as well as the leprosy he had contracted. Shandili directs the sun to rise again, and thus, Anasuya helps in the restoration of the sunrise. The deities, pleased by her actions, offer her a boon. Anasuya desires that the Trimurti (The supreme trinity of Brahma, Vishnu, and Shiva) be born to her, and that her husband and she be freed of the cycle of samsara. This boon is granted when Anasuya is mentally impregnated by Atri, and Chandra (Brahma), Dattatreya (Vishnu), and Durvasa (Shiva) are born to her as her sons.

Some legends state that later, when Rahu swallowed the sun, the whole world was cloaked in darkness. With powers granted by many years of austerity, Atri wrested the sun out of Rahu's hands, restoring light to the world, and pleasing the deities.

=== Meeting the Trimurti ===
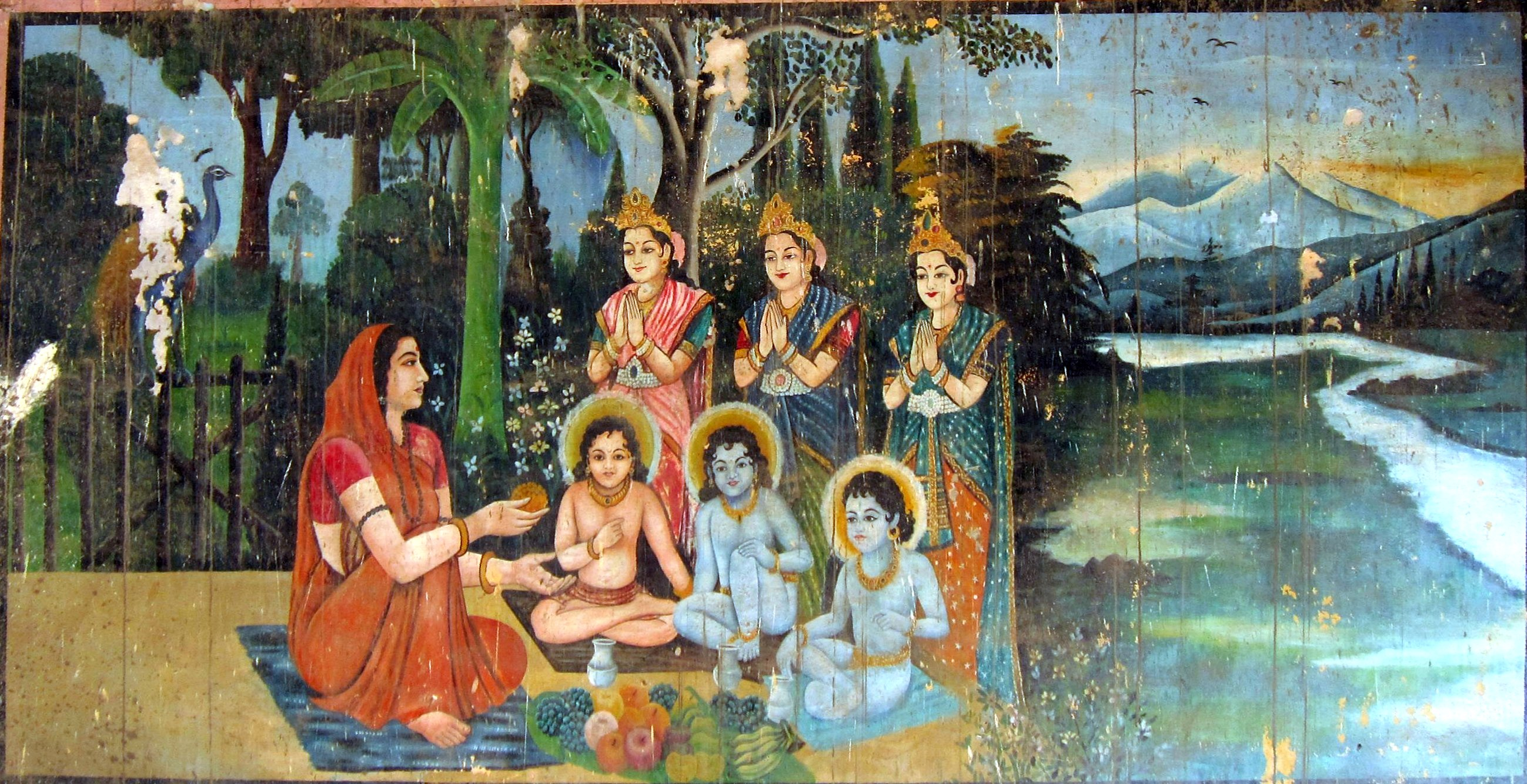
Anasuya feeds the Trimurti as the Tridevi request her to return them to their true forms.

According to a legend that is not featured in the primary Puranas, an argument once ensued among the Tridevi (the trinity of Saraswati, Lakshmi, and Parvati, the consorts of the Trimurti) regarding who among them was the most virtuous of women. The sage divinity, Narada, appeared before them, and was chosen to judge the matter. Narada opined that Anasuya was the most virtuous of women. He slyly told the Tridevi that Anasuya's chastity was such that she could bake beans made of iron. The three goddesses attempted to perform the task, but failed, uniting them in their envy towards Anasuya. The goddesses demanded that their husbands, the Trimurti, visit Atri's hermitage, and test Anasuya's virtue for themselves.

Unable to dissuade their wives from this course of action, Brahma, Vishnu, and Shiva assumed the guise of young sages, and visited Anasuya while Atri was bathing in a river. Invoking their rights of guests, the Trimurti claimed that due to a special fast they were undertaking, Anasuya would have to serve them food in the nude. Knowing that being seen naked by men other than her husband would cause her to lose her virtue, Anasuya sprinkled some water over her guests, turning them into infants. She then proceeded to disrobe, and served them food by breastfeeding them, both fulfilling their wishes, and still preserving her virtue. In some versions, she placed them in a cradle after lovingly nursing them as her own children. Informed by Narada of their consorts' plight, the chastened Tridevi descended upon Atri's hermitage, and requested Anasuya to restore their husbands to their true forms and Anasuya complied. The Trimurti, pleased that she had outwitted them, and that their wives had been humbled, offered Anasuya a boon. She asked that they be born as her children.

Variations of this legend present Anasuya also requesting the birth of a daughter named Shubhatreyi, and another where the Trimurti merge and turn into Anasuya's three-headed son, Dattatreya.

=== Counsel to Sita ===
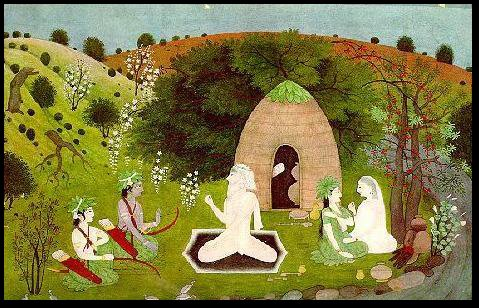
Anasuya counsels Sita (right), while Atri speaks to Rama and Lakshmana

In the Ramayana, during their exile in the forest, Rama and Sita visit the hermitage of the sage Atri, and the sage and his wife, Anasuya, treat their guests with honour. Atri tells Rama about the tapas shakti (power acquired from austerities) of his wife: Once, the world was bereft of rains, and the river Ganga had dried up, leading to the planet being plunged into a famine. Upon the request of the devas, Anasuya made the trees bear fruits once more, and resumed the flow of the Ganga. She also turned ten days into ten nights when they urged her to do so. Hearing about her powers, the prince grows to respect her. A similar legend exists in the Shiva Purana, where the goddess Ganga appears before Anasuya due to her devotion. The ascetic asks her to stay on the grove near her husband's hermitage, so that she could fetch him her holy water. Both Shiva and Ganga stay at the hermitage for a while, blessing the region.

Anasuya teaches Sita that absolute service to one's husband is the greatest tapas that is ordained to every woman. She teaches Sita the strīdharmarahasya, translated as the secrets of the dharma of women, regarding their duties towards their husbands and in-laws. The princess regales the tale of her wedding to Rama upon the ascetic's urging. The ascetic presents Sita with a very sacred garland, as well as a sublime gem before the couple's departure.

== Veneration ==
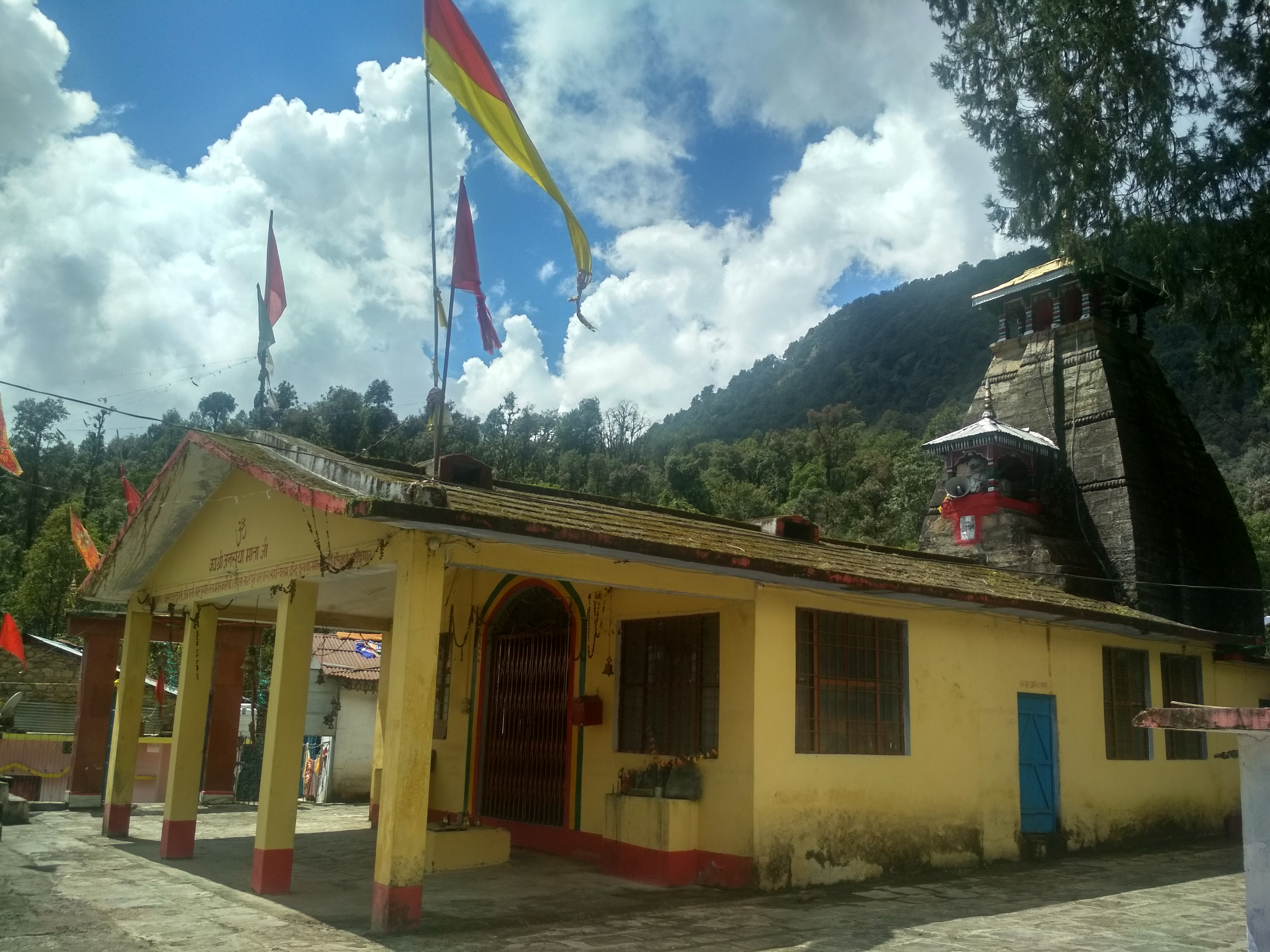
View of Anasuya Temple, Uttarakhand

The Anasuya Devi Temple is in Uttarakhand, located further upstream on the Amrit Ganga, a tributary of the Alakananda river.

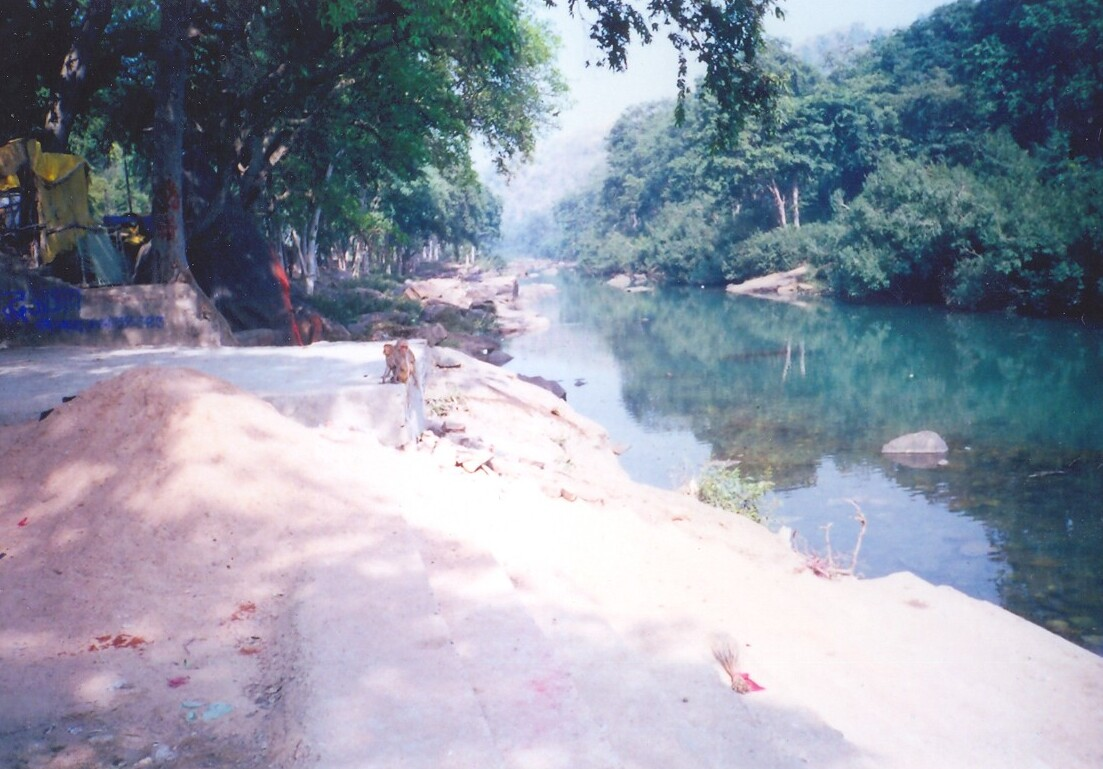
View of Mandakini River at Anasuya Ashrama

The Sati Anasuya Ashram is in Chitrakoot, Madhya Pradesh, located further upstream on the Mandakini River. It is 16 km away from the town, and set amidst thick forests where the melody of birdsong plays all day. It was where sage Atri, his wife Anasuya, and their three sons (who were three incarnations of Brahma, Vishnu, and Shiva), lived and are said to have meditated.

Valmiki describes in the Ramayana that there once was no rain in Chitrakuta for ten years. There was a severe famine and nothing was left for animals and birds to eat or drink. Sati Anasuya performed intensive austerities and got the river Mandakini down on earth. This led to the growth of greenery and forests, and eliminated the suffering of all sages and animals.

The Sati Anasuya Ashrama, at present, is a very peaceful place where several streams from the hills converge and form the Mandakini River. It is said that Rama along with Sita had visited this place to meet Atri and Anasuya. It is believed that this is the location where Sati Anasuya explained to Sita the grandeur and the importance of satitva (chastity). The dense forests of Dandaka start from this place. It is said to have been ruled by Ravana, who had appointed strong rakshasas such as Khara and Viradha as its rulers. The place is supposed to have once been infected by the terror of rakshasas.

== In popular culture ==
Two movies in the Telugu language, both entitled Sati Anasuya were released in 1957 and 1971. The 1957 film was directed by Kadaru Nagabhushanam and starred Anjali Devi and Gummadi. The 1971 film was directed by B. A. Subba Rao. Jamuna played the role of Anasuya, Sharada played Sumati and Tadepalli Lakshmi Kanta Rao played Atri Maharshi. The musical score was provided by P. Adinarayana Rao.

In 2026, Anasuya was portrayed by Geeta Agarwal Sharma in the film, Ramayana: Part 1.
