= Aurora Film Corporation =

Indian film production company

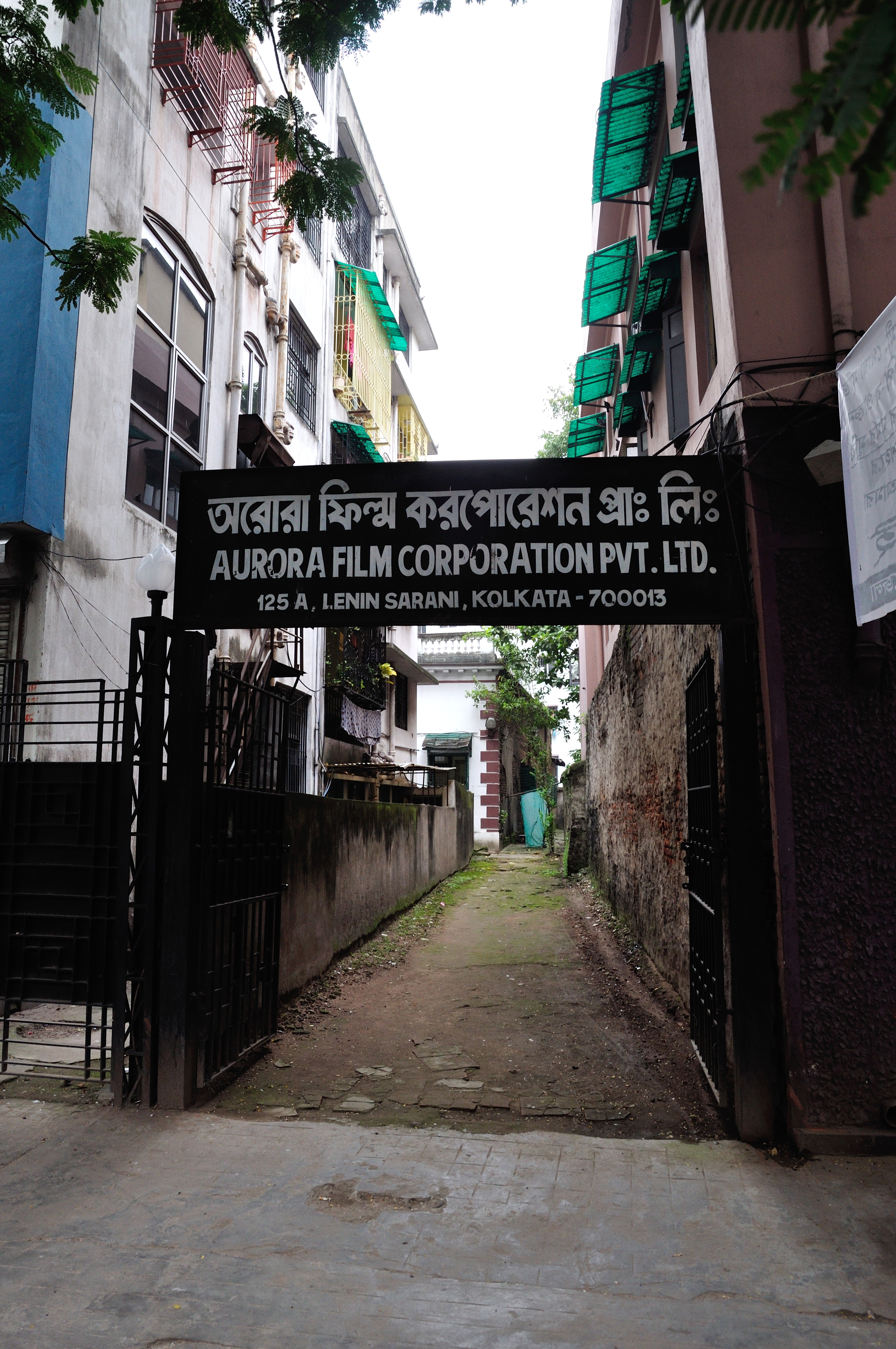
- Entrance of the Aurora Film Corporation in Kolkata
- Company type: Privately held company
- Industry: Film production
- Founded: 1906
- Headquarters: India

Aurora Film Corporation is a film production company based in Kolkata, West Bengal, India, and primarily involved in producing Bengali films. Aurora has produced and distributed several landmark Bengali-language films including Satyajit Ray's Pather Panchali.

== Early years ==
Anadi Nath Bose established the Aurora Film Company around 1906. The company at that time was a travelling cinema unit, and exhibited films, magic and drama shows in different parts of Bengal. The company made some short silent films, generally featuring female dancers and filmed with a hand-winding camera. It also started to produce newsreels and continued to import films from abroad.

In 1911, Anadi Nath Bose, cinematographer Debi Ghosh, and magician Charu Ghosh formed the Aurora Cinema Company, opening a studio and film-processing laboratory in North Kolkata. Anadi Nath Bose assumed sole management of the company in 1912. Anadi Nath Bose and Debi Ghosh began making more short features in 1916, notable among them Bisha Briksha, based on the novel of the same name by Bankimchandra Chattopadhyay. In 1917, the company received a contract from the British government to produce features for the entertainment of the armed forces. In 1919, Anadi Nath Bose began screening his films at the Manmohan Theatre in North Kolkata, and released the company's first feature-length film, Dasyu Ratnakar, in 1921, screening it at the Russa Theatre (today the Purna Cinema) in South Kolkata. In 1921 Anadi Nath Bose renamed his company Aurora Film Corporation.

== Later years ==
In 1946, a fire in Aurora's studio in Kolkata destroyed most of its films. Founder Anadi Nath Bose died on 21 September the same year. His elder son Ajit Bose and youngest son Arun Bose and, later, grandson (Anjan Bose), took over the management.

Aurora's studio was located in Maniktala, Kolkata. This was housed inside a palatial building made by Banabehari Shaw facing a large lake. This property had been leased by Anadi Nath Bose from Banabehari Shaw. Unfortunately after the lease lapsed, the studio was demolished. The company currently maintains a studio in the Salt Lake neighbourhood of Kolkata, and a post-production facility in Tollygunj.

Aurora was involved in the distribution and/or production of several acclaimed films. The company bought Pramathesh Barua's production company (Barua Pictures), and produced two films starring Barua, Pujari and Niyoti. Aurora was the distributor for Satyajit Ray's debut film Pather Panchali (1955); it was the distributor for Ray's Parash Pathar (1958) and producer for Jalsaghar (1958). The company partially financed Aparajito (1956), the second instalment of Rays' Apu Trilogy. Noted film director Ritwik Ghatak made documentaries for the company.

Aurora became inactive in the feature film industry in the 1970s, although it continued to produce shorts and documentaries as of 2011. The last feature film Aurora produced was Duronto Joy in 1973, and the last one it distributed was Moyna Tadanta in 1982.

According to Anjan Bose, the current (2011) managing director, Aurora is "the only film producing house in India being run by a family for three generations".Kalkokkho which released in 2022.

== Notable firsts ==
Aurora pioneered newsreels in India. These newsreels contain important video documents featuring personalities such as Rabindranath Tagore, Mahatma Gandhi, Subhas Chandra Bose, and events such as the celebration of the India's first Independence Day and the funeral of Rabindranath Tagore.

Aurora produced the first children's film of India, Hate Khari.

The company's Raja Rammohan (1965) was the first Bengali film to be declared tax-free (patrons did not have to pay entertainment tax). Bhagini Nivedita (1962) was the first Bengali film to be shot in England.
