= Satyanarayana (disambiguation) =

Satyanarayana or Satyanarayan or Satya Narayan is another name of the Hindu god Vishnu.

It may also refer to:

- Satyanarayana Puja, the special worship offered to him

== People ==
Satyanarayana is a popular given name among Telugu people.

- Aacharya Satyanarayana (born 1947), founder of Meera Charitable Trust in Jaipur, India
- Aarani Satyanarayana (1898–1969), Telugu film and stage actor
- Akula Satyanarayana, Indian politician from Andhra Pradesh, India
- Allu Venkata Satyanarayana (born 1940), Indian politician
- Amarapu Satyanarayana (1937–2011), Indian actor and singer
- Bendapudi Venkata Satyanarayana (1927–2005), dermatologist from Andhra Pradesh, India
- Botsa Satyanarayana (born 1958), Indian politician from Andhra Pradesh, India
- Chitturi Satyanarayana (1913–2012), Indian surgeon
- Dronamraju Satyanarayana (1933–2006), Indian politician
- Dusharla Satyanarayana, an Indian water rights activist and founder of Jala Sadhana Samithi (JSS)
- E. V. V. Satyanarayana (1956–2011), Telugu film director
- Garapaty Satyanarayana (1911–2002), Indian politician
- Garimella Satyanarayana (1893–1952), Telugu poet and Indian independence activist
- J. Satyanarayana (born 1954), retired 1977 batch IAS officer of Andhra Pradesh cadre
- K. V. Satyanarayana, Indian dancer
- Kaikala Satyanarayana (born 1935), Telugu actor
- Koccharlakota Satyanarayana (1915–1969), Telugu film and stage actor
- Koratala Satyanarayana (1923–2006), Indian politician
- Moturi Satyanarayana (1902–1995), Hindi activist and Indian Freedom fighter
- Nookala Chinna Satyanarayana (1923–2013), Indian singer
- Peela Govinda Satyanarayana, an Indian politician from the Telugu Desam Party
- Reddi Satyanarayana, Indian politician
- Sarve Satyanarayana (born 1954), Indian politician
- Satyanarayana Dasa (born 1954), Indian Gaudiya Vaisnava scholar
- Satyanarayana Nadella
- Satyanarayana Rajguru (1903–1997), Indian epigraphist and historian
- Somarapu Satyanarayana (born 1948), Indian politician
- Tangi Satyanarayana (1931–2009), Indian politician
- Urmila Satyanarayana, Indian dancer
- Vempatapu Satyanarayana (died 1970), teacher and leader of a peasant uprising in India
- Venigalla Satyanarayana (died 1918), Indian politician
- Viswanatha Satyanarayana (1895–1976), Telugu poet

== See also ==
- Satyanarayan (disambiguation)
- Satya Narayan (disambiguation)
- K. Satyanarayana (disambiguation)
- Sathyanarayana Raju (disambiguation)
