= Lava Kusa (1963 film) =

1963 film by C. Pullayya and C. S. Rao

- Theatrical release poster
- Directed by: C. Pullayya; C. S. Rao
- Screenplay by: C. Pullayya; C. S. Rao
- Dialogues by: Sadasivabrahmam (Telugu); A. K. Velan (Tamil)
- Based on: Ramayana
- Produced by: A. Sankara Reddy
- Starring: N. T. Rama Rao; Anjali Devi; Kantha Rao
- Cinematography: P. L. Rai
- Edited by: A. Sanjeevi
- Music by: Ghantasala
- Production company: Lalita Sivajyoti Films
- Release date: 29 March 1963
- Running time: 208 minutes
- Country: India
- Languages: Telugu; Tamil
- Box office: ₹3 crore

Lava Kusa (also spelled as Lava Kusha) is a 1963 Indian Hindu mythological film written and directed by C. Pullayya and C. S. Rao. Produced by Lalita Sivajyothi Films, the film is a remake of the 1934 production of the same name, which was also directed by C. Pullayya. The story is based on the Ramayana, focusing on Lava and Kusa, the twin sons of Rama and Sita. The cast includes N. T. Rama Rao as Rama, Anjali Devi as Sita, with Chittoor Nagayya, Kantha Rao, Sobhan Babu, S. Varalakshmi, and Kaikala Satyanarayana in supporting roles. The soundtrack features 27 songs, with the musical score primarily composed by Ghantasala.

Production of the film began in 1958 but was stopped due to financial constraints. When it restarted, Pullayya's health was deteriorating, so his son C. S. Rao took over. Lava Kusa is notable for being the first full-length colour film in Telugu cinema. The film was shot simultaneously in Telugu and Tamil, with minor differences in the cast. It was released on 29 March 1963 in Telugu and on 19 April 1963 in Tamil. Lava Kusa was a major commercial success, running for 75 weeks and grossing over ₹1 crore. The Telugu version won the National Film Award for Best Telugu Feature Film. The film was also dubbed in Kannada and later in Hindi in 1974. In 2011, it was rebooted as Sri Rama Rajyam.

== Plot ==
The film is based on the Uttara Kanda, the later part of the Ramayana attributed to Valmiki. It follows the lives of Lava and Kusa, the twin sons of Sita and Rama. The story begins with the Pattabhishekam (coronation) of Rama and the brief period of Rama Rajyam. However, after hearing accusations from a washerman about Sita's chastity, Rama sends her into exile. In the forest, Sita gives birth to Lava and Kusa. As they grow up, the twins eventually visit Ayodhya. The story also covers the Aswamedha Yagna performed by Rama and the resulting conflict between him and his sons, which culminates in the Pattabhishekam of Lava and Kusa. The film concludes with Rama ending his avatar and returning to the divine.

== Cast ==
Character	Actors in Language	
Character	Telugu	Tamil
Rama	N. T. Rama Rao	N. T. Rama Rao
Sita	Anjali Devi	Anjali Devi
Valmiki	Chittoor Nagayya	Chittoor Nagayya
Lava	Master Nagaraju	Master Uma
Kusa	Master Subrahmanyam	Master Murali
Lakshmana	Kantha Rao	Gemini Ganesan
Anjaneya	Sando Krishna	
Bharata	Kaikala Satyanarayana	
Shatrughna	Sobhan Babu	
Kausalya	P. Kannamba	P. Kannamba
Shanta	Sandhya	Sandhya
Bhudevi	S. Varalakshmi	S. Varalakshmi
Vasishtha	Dhulipala	
Valmiki's disciple	Ramana Reddy	
Wife of Valmiki's disciple	Suryakantham	
Washerman	Relangi	M. R. Radha
Wife of washerman	Girija	Manorama
Dancer (Special appearance)	Sukumari	Sukumari
	Sivarama Krishnayya	

== Production ==
=== Development ===
Producer A. Sankara Reddy aimed to make a film based on the Hindu epic Ramayana, with N. T. Rama Rao and Anjali Devi playing the roles of Rama and Sita. This inspiration came after watching them perform as Rama and Sita in the song "Murisenu Lokamu" from his earlier film Charana Dasi (1956). Sankara Reddy approached director C. Pullayya, who had plans to remake his 1934 Telugu film Lava Kusa, to direct the film under his production banner, Lalitha Sivajyothi Films. The remake, also titled Lava Kusa, became the first full-length colour film in Telugu cinema. Screenwriter Vempati Sadasivabrahmam, who had previously worked with Pullayya on Charana Dasi, was hired to script the film. Sadasivabrahmam remained faithful to the original screenplay by Vallabhajosyula Ramanamurthy and the dialogues written by Balijepalli Lakshmikantham.

The production costs increased significantly when Sankara Reddy decided to shoot the film in colour. Although production started in 1958, it stalled after one-third of the planned portions were completed due to financial difficulties. After five years, Sunderlal Nahata agreed to fund the project in exchange for distribution rights, while B. Nagi Reddi provided studio facilities. By this time, C. Pullayya's health had deteriorated, and Sankara Reddy initially approached B. N. Reddi to complete the film. B. N. Reddi suggested that C. Pullayya's son, C. S. Rao, should take over the project. Though initially hesitant, C. S. Rao agreed to complete the film after his father convinced him that the emotional scenes set in Rama's palace were crucial to the story.

=== Casting ===
Lava Kusa was filmed as a bilingual in both Telugu and Tamil with variations in the cast. In the Telugu version, Anaparthi Nagaraju and Viyyuri Subrahmanyam were cast as Lava and Kusa, respectively. For the Tamil version, the roles were portrayed by Baby Uma and Master Murali. Subrahmanyam was selected after the filmmakers saw him perform the role of Kusa in a play in Kakinada. He was nine years old when production started and 14 by the time the film was released. Unlike Subrahmanyam, Nagaraju had previously acted in a few films. Pullayya offered him the role of Lava after observing his performance, and he was eight years old when filming commenced.

Kantha Rao was cast as Lakshmana, but during production, he was diagnosed with eosinophilia and gained weight. He was then considered for the role of Satrughna. N. T. Rama Rao insisted that Kantha Rao play Lakshmana, and Sobhan Babu was cast as Satrughna instead. Other prominent cast members included Kaikala Satyanarayana as Bharata, Chittor V. Nagayya as Valmiki, and Sando Krishna as Anjaneya.

=== Filming ===
The shooting took place at a big mango orchard near Chennai. We used to wake up at 4 am and head to the sets. We would be ready with all our make-up on by 7 am. Both of us used to undergo an hour's training everyday. We even had to learn viluvidya (arrow fighting). I still remember how we used to call our trainer, Sharma master. He painstakingly taught us the art of shooting arrows.

— Nagaraju, in an interview with The Times of India in April 2013.

Nagaraju and Subrahmanyam underwent daily training sessions for an hour to memorize dialogues and practice archery for their roles. Filming usually started at 7:00 AM and continued until 9:00 PM, but the child actors were released an hour earlier to ensure they got enough rest. According to the actors, N. T. Rama Rao and Anjali Devi were fully dedicated to their roles. When none of the crowns designed for Rama suited him, Rama Rao used the crown he had worn in Charanadasi, which costed only ₹140 at the time.

In one scene, where Nagaraju had to cry, glycerin was used but proved ineffective. Anjali Devi then slapped him to evoke genuine tears, and the scene was successfully filmed. Afterward, she consoled him for 15 minutes.

The climax sequences were filmed first, which caused a continuity issue when the child actors appeared older in the scenes filmed later due to the delays in production. In the scene where Rama embraces Lava and Kusa, Pullayya had the child actors stand on small tables to match Rama Rao's height, showcasing his respect for the character and the limitations of the technology available at the time. Pullayya's associate, G. V. R. Seshagiri Rao, suggested reshooting a scene where a pregnant Sita runs toward Valmiki, as it appeared awkward.

== Music ==
The music of Lava Kusa was composed by Ghantasala. The Tamil version has additional music by K. V. Mahadevan.

Telugu
No.	Title	Lyrics	Singer(s)	Length
1.	"Sri Vidyam Jagatam Dhatri (Slokam)"	Vempati Sadasiva	Ghantasala	01:14
2.	"Saptashvaratha (Slokam)"		Ghantasala Venkateswara Rao	01:29
3.	"Navarathnojvala (Poem)"		Ghantasala	01:06
4.	"Inthakubooni Vacchi (Poem)"	Vempati Sadasiva	Ghantasala Venkateswara Rao	01:21
5.	"Jaya Jaya Rama Srirama"	Samudrala Sr.	J. V. Raghavulu, Sarojini	01:18
6.	"Ramanna Ramudu Kodanda Ramudu"	Samudrala Sr.	P. Susheela, K. Rani	04:15
7.	"Virise Challani Vennela"	Samudrala Sr.	S. Janaki	02:50
8.	"Ravanu Samharinchi (Poem)"	Samudrala Sr.	Ghantasala Venkateswara Rao	01:21
9.	"Vollanori Maama Nee Pillani"		Ghantasala Venkateswara Rao, Jikki, J. V. Raghavulu, Swarnalata	03:37
10.	"Ye Mahaniya Sadhvi (Poem)"		Ghantasala Venkateswara Rao	01:10
11.	"Ye Nimishaniki"	Kosaraju	Ghantasala Venkateswara Rao	04:00
12.	"Jagadabhi Ramudu Sri Raamude"	Samudrala Sr.	Ghantasala Venkateswara Rao, P. Leela, P. Susheela, Mallik	03:51
13.	"Enduke Naa Meeda Kopam"		Pithapuram Nageswara Rao, Swarnalata	02:40
14.	"Ramakathanu Vinarayya"	Samudrala Sr.	P. Leela, P Susheela	04:28
15.	"Vurake Kanniru"	Samudrala Sr.	P. Leela, P. Susheela	03:00
16.	"Vinudu Vinudu"	Samudrala Sr.	P. Leela, P susheela	04:14
17.	"Sriramuni Charitamunu"	Samudrala Sr.	P. Leela, P Susheela	05:35
18.	"Sriraghavam Dasharathatmaja"		P. Leela, P Susheela	04:07
19.	"Srirama Sugunadhama"	Vempati Sadasiva	P. Leela, P. Susheela	03:01
20.	"Sandehinchaku"	Kosaraju	Ghantasala Venkateswara Rao	03:07
21.	"Ashwamedha Yaganiki"	Samudrala Sr.	Ghantasala Venkateswara Rao, Madhavapeddi, Raghavulu, Rani, Sarojini	03:24
22.	"Savanashvambidi (Poem)"	Samudrala Sr.	P. Susheela	01:15
23.	"Hreemkaraasana (Poem)"		P. Susheela	01:33
24.	"Leru Kushalavula Saati"	Vempati Sadasiva	P. Leela, P Susheela	02:33
25.	"Stree Balavruddhula (Poem)"	Samudrala Sr.	Ghantasala, P. Leela, Susheela	01:18
26.	"Sri Rama Parandhama"	Samudrala Sr.	P. Leela, K. Jamuna Rani, P Susheela	02:25
27.	"Thandri Pampunanegi (Poem)"	Samudrala Sr.	Ghantasala, P. Leela, P Susheela	02:36
28.	"Darken Balakundani (Poem)"	Samudrala Sr.	P. Leela	00:40
29.	"Rangaru Bangaru (Poem)"	Samudrala Sr.	Ghantasala	01:41
30.	"Veyara Debba"	Samudrala Sr.	Ghantasala & Jikki	03:17
31.	"Ramaswami Padambujambu (Poem)"		P. Susheela	00:32
32.	"Raajata Rajadharmamata (Poem)"		S. Varalakshmi	01:28
33.	"Prathi Dinamenu (Poem)"		Ghantasala	01:24
34.	"Inudu Asthadriki (Poem)"		P. Leela	01:31
35.	"Kannularaga Tudisari (Poem)"		P. Susheela	01:02
36.	"Kadagine Manovakkaya (Poem)"		P. Susheela	00:57
37.	"Idhe Mana Ashramambu (Poem)"		Ghantasala	01:35
38.	"Aapavaada Dooshita (Poem)"		P. Susheela	01:54

Tamil
No.	Title	Lyrics	Singer(s)	Length
1.	"Sri Vidyam Jagatam Dhatri (Slokam)"	A. Maruthakasi	Ghantasala	01:14
2.	"Saptashva Rathamarudham Prachandam Kashyapatmajam (Slokam)"	A. Maruthakasi	Ghantasala
3.	"Navajyotyo (Poem)"	A. Maruthakasi	Ghantasala	01:06
4.	"Intaku Bunivachchi Vachiyimpaka Podune"	Vempati Sadasiva	Ghantasala Venkateswara Rao
5.	"Jaya Jaya Raamaa Sree Raama"	A. Maruthakasi	J. V. Raghavulu & Udutha Sarojini	01:18
6.	"Ramanna Ramudu Kodanda Ramudu"	A. Maruthakasi	P. Susheela, K. Jamuna Rani
7.	"Udhayam Aaanadhe Vennilaa"	A. Maruthakasi	S. Janaki	02:18
8.	"Ilangaiyar Kon Thanai Azhitthu"	A. Maruthakasi	Ghantasala	01:21
9.	"Vollanori Maamaa Nee Pillani"		Ghantasala Venkateswara Rao, Jikki, J. V. Raghavulu, Swarnalata	03:37
10.	"Ye Mahaniya Sadhvi Jagadeka Pavitrata (Poem)"		Ghantasala Venkateswara Rao	01:10
11.	"Indrum Illai Andrum Illai Endrume Illai"	A. Maruthakasi	T. M. Soundararajan	04:00
12.	"Thiruvalar Naayagan Sree Raamane"	A. Maruthakasi	Ghantasala, P. Leela, P. Susheela & K. Rani	03:01
13.	"Thappu Thappunu Thuniyai Thuvaichu"	A. Maruthakasi	Thiruchi Loganathan & L. R. Eswari	03:17
14.	"Jagam Pugazhum Punniya Kadhai 1"	A. Maruthakasi	P. Leela & P. Susheela	03:50
15.	"Maari Pol Kanneer Sindha"	A. Maruthakasi	P. Leela & P. Susheela	01:52
16.	"Jagam Pugazhum Punniya Kadhai 2"	A. Maruthakasi	P. Leela & P. Susheela	03:15
17.	"Jagam Pugazhum Punniya Kadhai 3"	A. Maruthakasi	P. Leela & P. Susheela	05:35
18.	"Sreeraghavam Dasharathathmajam Aprameyam"		P. Leela & P. Susheela	04:07
19.	"Raama Suguna Seelaa"	A. Maruthakasi	P. Leela & P. Susheela	03:01
20.	"Sandhegam Ennamma"	A. Maruthakasi	Ghantasala	03:07
21.	"Vetri Murasu Olikka Seiyyum Aswamedha Yaagaam"	A. Maruthakasi	V. N. Sundharam & K. Rani	03:24
22.	"Veera Maadhaa Kausalyaa Dhevi Petra"	A. Maruthakasi	P. Susheela	01:15
23.	"Hreemkaraasana (Poem)"		P. Susheela	01:33
24.	"Eedu Inai Namakku Edhu Indha Boomiyil"	A. Maruthakasi	P. Leela & P. Susheela	02:33
25.	"Stree Balavrudhula Tega"	A. Maruthakasi	Ghantasala, P. Susheela, P. Leela
26.	"Sriraama Parandhamaa Jayarama Parandhama"	A. Maruthakasi	A. P. Komala, K. Rani & J. V. Raghavulu	02:25
27.	"Thandri Pampunanegi"	A. Maruthakasi	Ghantasala, P. Susheela, P. Leela	02:36
28.	"Takkani Balakundani"	A. Maruthakasi	P. Leela	00:40
29.	"Ponggum Olimayame"	A. Maruthakasi	Seerkazhi Govindarajan	01:41 or 03:01
30.	"Thappu Thappunu Thuniyai Thuvaichu"	A. Maruthakasi	Thiruchi Loganathan & L. R. Eswari	03:17
31.	"Ramaswamy Padambujambulambu"		P. Susheela	05:59
32.	"Raajada Rajadharmamada Ramudu"		S. Varalakshmi	01:28
33.	"Prathi Dinamenu"		Ghantasala	01:24
34.	"Ninu Dattadriki Cherakunda"		P. Leela	01:31
35.	"Kannularaga Tudisari"		P. Susheela	01:02
36.	"Kadagine Manokkaya"		P. Susheela	00:57
37.	"Edhi Mana Ashramambu"		Ghantasala	01:35
38.	"Aapavaada Dooshi"		P. Susheela	01:54

== Reception ==
Lava Kusa achieved significant commercial success, running uninterrupted for 75 weeks, a record in Telugu cinema. The film was released in 26 centres and achieved a 100-day run in all of them, a remarkable feat at the time. It went on to have a 150-day run in those centres and a 175-day run in 18 centres. Due to high demand, many film prints had to be relocated to different centres across Andhra Pradesh. Overall, the film ran for 100 days in 62 centres and had a 175-day run in 18 centres, grossing more than ₹1 crore.

== Accolades ==
- National Film Award for Best Feature Film in Telugu

== Legacy ==
Lava Kusa is regarded as a classic in Telugu cinema. In January 2007, M. L. Narasimham of The Hindu included the film in a list of significant works, alongside Mala Pilla (1938), Raithu Bidda (1939), Vara Vikrayam (1939), Bhakta Potana (1942), Shavukaru (1950), Malliswari (1951), Peddamanushulu (1954), and Mayabazar (1955), citing their influence on society and Telugu cinema. N. T. Rama Rao's portrayal of Rama in Lava Kusa became iconic, leading him to reprise the role in several other films over the next two decades. (Note: Rama Rao reprised the role of Rama in various unrelated films such as Sampoorna Ramayanam (1958), Sri Ramanjaneya Yuddham (1975), and Sri Rama Pattabhishekam (1978).)

During the programme Telugu Cinema Prasthanam organized by the film society of Visakhapatnam, actor and writer Ravi Kondala Rao highlighted Lava Kusa as one of the cult films that defined Telugu cinema. He compared it to other landmark films such as Raja Harishchandra (1913), Bhakta Prahlada (1932), Mala Pilla (1938), Pathala Bhairavi (1951), and Devadasu (1953). In 2011, director Bapu adapted the storyline of Lava Kusa for his film Sri Rama Rajyam, which featured Rama Rao's son, Nandamuri Balakrishna.
