= Lava Kusa (1934 film) =

1934 Telugu film by C. Pullayya

- Directed by: C. Pullayya
- Screenplay by: Vallabhajosyula Ramana Murthy
- Dialogues by: Balijepalli Lakshmikantha Kavi
- Produced by: Motilal Chamaria
- Starring: Parupalli Subbaravu; Sriranjani Sr. Master Bhimaraju; Master Malleswara Rao; Parupalli Satyanarayana
- Music by: Prabhala Satyanarayana
- Production company: East India Film Company
- Release date: 22 December 1934
- Running time: 165 minutes
- Country: India
- Language: Telugu

Lava Kusa is a 1934 Telugu-language Hindu mythological film directed by C. Pullayya and produced by Motilal Chamaria under the East India Film Company. The film is based on the a play of the same name, written by K. Subrahmanya Sastry, and marks an important milestone in early Telugu cinema. It was one of the first Telugu films to feature recorded songs, following the trend set by Sati Savitri (1933). All the songs in Lava Kusa were well received, contributing to its success.

The film narrates the Ramayana story of Sita, who, after retiring to the forest, gives birth to twin sons, Lava and Kusa. Unaware that Rama is their father, the twins later confront him. The film was a major hit and ran in some theatres for over a year. It marked the acting debut of singer Sriranjani. It was also one of the first Telugu films to have a wide release in rural areas of Andhra Pradesh.

C. Pullayya, in collaboration with his son C. S. Rao, remade Lava Kusa in 1963, featuring N. T. Rama Rao and Anjali Devi in the lead roles.

== Cast ==
- Parupalli Subbarao as Rama
- Sriranjani Senior as Sita
- Master Bhimaraju as Lavudu
- Master Malleswara Rao as Kusudu
- Parupalli Satyanarayana as Valmiki
- Eemani Venkataramayya as Lakshmana
- K. Nagamani as Bharata
- Chari as Satrughna
- Madduri Buchanna Sastri as Vasishta
- Dr. H. V. Venkatachalam as Rajakudu
- P. V. Ramana Rao as Erigadu
- Ramadevi as Dharitri
- Padmabala
- Bhushanashastri

== Production ==
Prior to Lava Kusa, a total of nine films were produced in various Indian languages based on the same storyline. The first adaptation was a silent film made in 1919 by R. Nataraja Mudaliar. The East India Film Company made an attempt to produce the film in Telugu in 1934. The dialogues were written by the prominent poet Balijepalli Lakshmikantam.

For the role of Rama, Parupalli Subbaraju was selected. Sriranjani Sr. played the role of Sita. Masters Bhimaraju and Mallikarjuna Rao were cast as Lava and Kusa. B. C. H. Narasinga Rao was chosen for the role of Rajakudu. Notably, Sriranjani was already famous for playing male roles in plays. The casting choice for Lakshmana was made with the consideration that the actor should resemble Parupalli Subbaraju, who played Rama, leading to the selection of Eemani Venkataramayya.

Lava Kusa was filmed in Calcutta. The chariots and settings used were repurposed from Debaki Bose's Bengali film Seeta (1934).

== Music ==
The music for the film was composed by Prabhala Satyanarayana. The lyrics for all the songs were penned by Balijepalli Lakshmikantam. Some tunes used in the film were adapted from songs previously utilized in the film Seeta, while other songs and verses were originally written for this film. In total, the film features 21 songs and 10 verses. The songs became widely popular and were sung as devotional hymns. The Sun Recording Company in Kakinada released the film's songs as records. According to film journalist Pulagam Chinnarayana, the practice of publishing song lyrics as books began with this film.

== Release ==
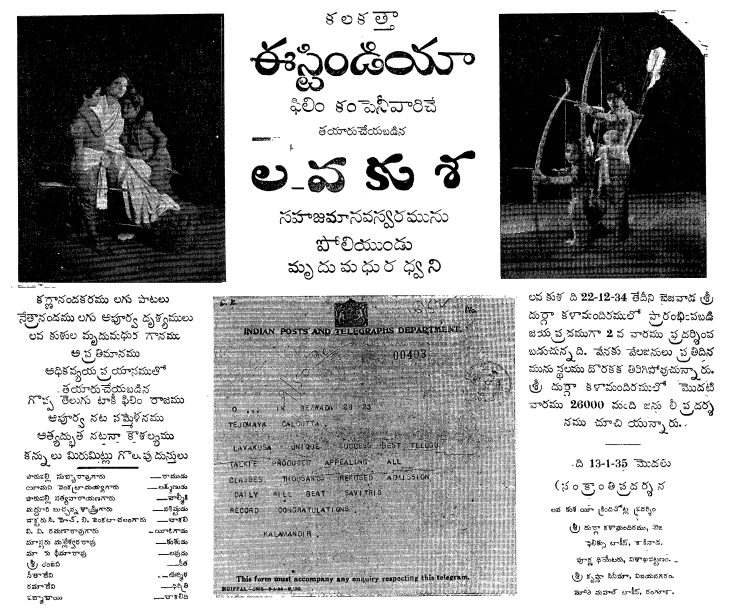
Advertisement for Lava Kusa in Andhra Patrika on 5 January 1935

The contract method of releasing films was prevalent, where prints of the films did not return until the contract ended, leading to a gradual decline of this method. Before this, films were showcased using projectors made from wooden pieces and old machinery. The East India Film Company signed a contract with the "Chatterjee Bhupal Sound System" in Calcutta to introduce "Single Star Simplex Projectors" with this film. The methods established during this time laid the groundwork for the technological advancements that would eventually evolve into digital cinema.

== Reception ==
The film was a major hit, running in theaters for over a year and drawing large crowds. At Vijayawada's Durga Kalamandiram theatre, the atmosphere resembled a festival due to the high turnout. The film's collections surprised everyone, setting a record by earning ₹40,000, a significant achievement for early Telugu cinema.

== See also ==
- Lava Kusa - 1963 film
