= Inaganti Venkata Rao =

Indian journalist (born 1942)

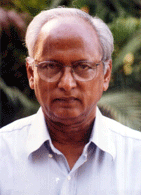
- Born: Inaganti Venkata Rao; 7 August 1942 (age 84)
- Education: Hindu College, Guntur
- Occupations: Journalist, Media Entrepreneur

IVR, better known as Inaganti Venkata Rao, is a journalist and political analyst. He is the Former Chairman of Monica Broadcasting, a holding company which owns the Mahaa News Network, the operator of Mahaa News Channel. He is also the Ex-Chairman of the Press Academy of Andhra Pradesh. He is the former editor of Andhra Jyothi, a widely circulated newspaper.

== Personal life ==
Inaganti Venkata Rao was born on 7 August 1942. He is Former Chairman of Mahaa News Network. He started his career by joining Andhra Patrika Daily in 1964. Later, he worked at Andhra Jyothi as a Sub-Editor. His career changed when he joined as Bureau Chief of Andhra Jyothi at Hyderabad in 1979. Soon after, he became Resident Editor of Andhra Jyothi in 1989 and then later took charge as Editor of Andhra Jyothi. He is one of the few Telugu journalists to have visited the Soviet Union – for two weeks in May 1988 as one among the three-member Indian Press delegation that took part in the Indian Festival. He is known to have visited China for documenting the historic visit of late Prime Minister Rajiv Gandhi in December 1988. He later visited the United States in 1990 on the invitation of USIS under the International Visitors (IV) programme as a member of a team that toured extensively in the US for four weeks. The subject of study of the team was federalism, local governments, and their functioning in the USA.

His weekly political analysis, "Uluku Paluku," was the most popular column in Telugu. The column appeared for 14 years (up to year 2000). It brought fame the name, and is considered as source material on Andhra Politics. Now his political analysis hour, called "Editors Time," is immensely popular and possibly the main reason behind continued the operation of Mahaa.

Known for his love of Telugu language and literature, in 2001 he started non-profit magazine "patrika," a purely Telugu literary monthly magazine. It operated for a decade solely through subscriptions from other Telugu literary pandits.

== Bibliography ==
He is the author of several books, of which some are:

- 1. Rajasuyam (Compilations of articles on current politics)
- 3. Viswa Vihaaram - a travelogue.

== Magazine articles ==
1. Telugu Velugulu - a compilation of pen portraits of eminent Telugus published in Andhra Patrika weekly in the 1960s. 2. Kothakeratalu in 2003 - a compilation of pen portraits of eminent Telugus published in the 1970s in Andhra Jyothi weekly.

== Positions ==
Ex-Chairman, AP Press Academy
Chairman, Mahaa News Network
