= Pakkinti Ammayi =

Pakkinti Ammayi may refer to:

- Pakka Inti Ammayi, a 1953 Indian Telugu-language film
- Pakkinti Ammayi (1981 film), a 1981 Indian Telugu-language film
