= Chittajallu =

Chittajallu (also spelled as Chittajalu) is one of the Indian family names.

- Chittajallu Pullaiah, famous Telugu film director.
- Chittajallu Srinivasa Rao, famous Telugu film director.
