= Devanthakudu (1960 film) =

1960 film directed by C. Pullaiah

- Theatrical release poster
- Directed by: C. Pullayya
- Written by: Sadasivabrahmam (dialogues)
- Screenplay by: Adurthi Narasimha Murthy
- Story by: Dinabandhu Mitra
- Produced by: C. Pullayya
- Starring: N. T. Rama Rao; Krishna Kumari
- Cinematography: A. Shanmugam
- Edited by: T. R. Srinivasulu
- Music by: Aswatthama
- Production company: Bhargavi Films
- Release date: 7 July 1960
- Running time: 180 minutes
- Country: India
- Language: Telugu

Devanthakudu is a 1960 Indian Telugu-language fantasy action comedy film directed and produced by C. Pullayya. The film stars N. T. Rama Rao and Krishna Kumari, with K. V. S. Sarma, S. V. Ranga Rao, Kantha Rao, Kalyanam Raghuramaiah, Peketi Sivaram, P. Hemalatha and Mohana in supporting roles.

Devanthakudu is a remake of the 1958 Bengali film Jamalaye Jibanta Manush, itself based on a play with the same title by Dinabandhu Mitra. It was simultaneously filmed in Tamil as Naan Kanda Sorgam with a largely different cast. The film released on 7 July 1960 and became a commercial success.

== Cast ==
- N. T. Rama Rao as Sundaram
- Krishna Kumari as Meenakshi
- K. V. S. Sarma as Bhadrayya
- S. V. Ranga Rao as Yama
- Kantha Rao as Vishnu
- Kalyanam Raghuramaiah as Narada
- Peketi Sivaram as Vichitragupta
- P. Hemalatha as Bhadrayya's wife
- Mohana as Lakshmi

== Production ==
=== Development ===
After the success of the Telugu film Pakka Inti Ammayi (1953), which was based on the Bengali film Pasher Bari (1952), its director C. Pullayya waited for five years to adapt another comical Bengali story for Telugu-speaking audiences. The Bengali fantasy comedy Jamalaye Jibanta Manush (1958) was running successfully in cinemas in Bengal. Its screenplay, written by Gour Shee, incorporated satirical attacks on contemporary life and social issues. Pullayya established the production company Bhargavi Films with Ch. Subbarao, a Madras-based building contractor, as managing director and himself as producer, and bought the rights to remake Jamalaye Jibanta Manush in Telugu and Tamil languages. The Telugu version was titled Devanthakudu and the Tamil version was titled Naan Kanda Sorgam. Adurthi Narasimha Murthy was the screenwriter of Devanthakudu, and the dialogues were written by Vempati Sadasivabrahmam. Cinematography was handled by A. Shanmugam and the editing by T. R. Srinivasulu while A. Krishnarao served as art director.

=== Casting and filming ===
N. T. Rama Rao was cast as the male lead Sundaram and Krishna Kumari as the female lead Meenakshi. S. V. Ranga Rao, who played Yama in Sati Savitri (1957), reprised his role in Devanthakudu. Kalyanam Raghuramaiah played Narada in addition to working as playback singer. The Tamil version featured a largely different cast, with only Ranga Rao mutual to both. In the Tamil version Naan Kanda Sorgam, Krishna Kumari's elder sister Sowcar Janaki played Meenakshi.

Devanthakudu and Naan Kanda Sorgam were filmed simultaneously, with scenes from the former being filmed first and those from the latter second. Because of a belief that if Rama Rao wore multiple different get-ups the film would succeed, he sported two additional disguises for this film: that of a woman, and that of an elderly dance teacher. Though a couple of dialogues from the Yama durbar were borrowed from the Bengali version, Sadasivabrahmam largely followed his own diktat and wrote apt and appealing dialogues reflecting the lifestyle and societal problems of the 1960s. The final cut of Devanthakudu was 17 reels, longer than the Bengali original which was 13 reels.

== Soundtrack ==
The soundtrack was composed by G. Aswatthama, and the lyrics were written by Aarudra. The songs "Go Go Go Gongura" and "Entha Madhura" attained popularity, as did the various shlokas and poems narrated by Ghantasala and Raghuramaiah.

| No. | Title | Singer(s) | Length |
|---|---|---|---|
| 1. | "Go Go Go Gongura" | P. B. Sreenivas, S. Janaki | 2:09 |
| 2. | "Entha Madhura" | P. B. Sreenivas, S. Janaki | 3:55 |
| 3. | "Sreedevi" | P. Leela | 2:57 |
| 4. | "Santakaram" | Ghantasala | 1:03 |
| 5. | "Parithranaya" | Ghantasala | 0:33 |
| 6. | "Dhoomakethu" | Ghantasala | 0:36 |
| 7. | "Kalaganti Namma" | P. B. Sreenivas, S. Janaki | 6:58 |
| 8. | "Jagamantha" | P. B. Sreenivas, S. Janaki | 2:55 |
| 9. | "Ho Dhim Dhimi" | Ghantasala | 1:09 |
| 10. | "Dharma Devata" | Madhavapeddi Satyam | 0:52 |
| 11. | "Anni Lokalu" | Ghantasala | 0:53 |
| 12. | "Sritha Jana Pala" | Kalyanam Raghuramaiah | 3:12 |
| 13. | "Evari Manthramu" | Kalyanam Raghuramaiah | 1:08 |
| 14. | "Itu Pakka" | Ghantasala | 1:11 |
| 15. | "Bhoo Bhuvarloka" | Ghantasala | 1:45 |
| 16. | "Bhaliraa" | S. Janaki | 3:12 |
| 17. | "Pooraya" | Kalyanam Raghuramaiah | 1:43 |
| 18. | "Deni Mahima" | Kalyanam Raghuramaiah | 0:52 |
| 19. | "Ilalo" | P. Leela, N. L. Ganasaraswathi | 8:33 |
| Total length: | | | 45:36 |

== Release and reception ==
Devanthakudu was released on 7 July 1960. The film was commercially successful. Some critics of the time wrote that the Bengali story was copied from the 1934 American film, Death Takes a Holiday. But Dinabandhu Mitra wrote the play Jamalaye Jibanta Manush before his death in 1873.

== Legacy ==
Devanthakudu became a trendsetter for "socio-fantasy films" in Telugu cinema. The film inspired N. T. Rama Rao's own Yamagola (1977). S. S. Rajamouli mentioned in an interview that the basic plot of his film Yamadonga (2007) was inspired by Devanthakudu and Yamagola.
