= Devanthakudu =

Devanthakudu may refer to:

- Devanthakudu (1960 film)
- Devanthakudu (1984 film)
