= Malli Pelli =

Malli Pelli may refer to:

- Malli Pelli (1939 film), Telugu film directed by Y. V. Rao
- Malli Pelli (2023 film), Telugu film written and directed by M. S. Raju
