= K. Vasu =

Indian film director (1951–2023)

- కె.వాసు
- Born: Kolli Srinavasa Rao; 7 January 1951; Hyderabad, Hyderabad State, India
- Died: 26 May 2023 (aged 72); Hyderabad, Telangana, India
- Occupations: Film director, screenwriter
- Spouse: Ratnakumari
- Children: Annapurna, Deepti
- Parent(s): K. Pratyagatma, Satyavati

Kolli Srinavasa Rao (7 January 1951 – 26 May 2023), known professionally as K. Vasu, was an Indian film director and screenwriter, who worked in Telugu cinema. Son of K. Pratyagatma, an Indian film journalist, director and producer known for his works in Telugu and Hindi cinema.

Vasu died in Hyderabad on 26 May 2023, at the age of 72.

== Filmography ==
| Year | Title | Notes |
|---|---|---|
| 1974 | Aadapillala Thandri | also story and producer |
| 1978 | Pranam Khareedu | |
| 1979 | Kothala Raayudu | |
| 1979 | Edi Papam Edi Punyam | |
| 1979 | Muddu Muchata | |
| 1979 | Oka Challani Rathri | |
| 1980 | Aarani Mantalu | |
| 1980 | Gopala Rao Gari Ammayi | |
| 1981 | Devudu Mamayya | |
| 1981 | Thodu Dongalu | |
| 1981 | Babulugaadi Debba | |
| 1981 | Guvvala Janta | |
| 1981 | Pakkinti Ammayi | A remake of the 1953 Telugu film of the same name which in itself was a remake of the Bengali-language film Pasher Bari (1952) based on the namesake short story by Arun Chowdhury. Also screenplay. |
| 1982 | Kalahala Kapuram | |
| 1984 | Allullostunnaru | |
| 1984 | Eduruleni Monagallu | |
| 1984 | Kotha Dhampathulu | |
| 1985 | America Alludu | also screenplay and actor |
| 1986 | Sri Shirdi Saibaba Mahathyam | also screenplay |
| 1987 | Dammit Katha Addam Thirigindi | also screenplay |
| 1989 | Ayyappa Swamy Mahatyam | |
| 1990 | Chinna Kodalu | |
| 1991 | Prema Chitram Pelli Vichitram | |
| 1991 | Aada Pilla | |
| 1991 | Pichi Pullayya | |
| 1991 | Palleturi Pellam | |
| 1992 | Joker Mama Super Alludu | also screenplay |
| 1993 | Server Somanna | Kannada film |
| 1993 | Repati Rowdy | |
| 1994 | Puttinilla Mettinilla | |
| 1999 | Meese Hottha Gandasige Demandappo Demandu | Kannada film; as producer only |
| 2004 | Intlo Srimathi Veedhilo Kumari | A remake of Priyadarshan's 2003 Hindi film Hungama, which itself borrowed its story from the director's Poochakkoru Mookkuthi (1984). |
| 2008 | Gajibiji | Also a producer and writer. |
| 2016 | Tingarodu | Also a producer. |
