= Sriranjani Sr. =

Telugu theatre and film actress (1906–1939)

Mangalagiri Sriranjani (1906–1939), also known as Sriranjani Senior, was a Telugu theatre and film actress and singer. Born in Narasaraopet Taluk, Andhra Pradesh, she gained fame in the 1930s through her recordings and audio releases with the Gramophone Company of India. Sriranjani was a significant stage actress with Krishna Vilasa Nataka Samajam, known for her portrayal of mythological male roles such as Krishna, Abhimanyu, and Satyavan.

She made her film debut in Telugu cinema with C. Pullayya's Lava Kusa (1934) and later appeared in notable films like Sri Krishna Leelalu (1935) and Mayabazar (1936). Her film career was successful but brief; she acted in only eight films before her death from cancer in 1939.

Sriranjani Senior was the elder sister of actress Sriranjani Junior and the mother of director M. Mallikarjuna Rao.

== Filmography ==
- Lava Kusa (1934)
- Silver King (1935)
- Sri Krishna Leelalu (1935)
- Sati Tulasi (1936)
- Sasirekha Parinayam (1936)
- Sarangadhara (1937) (actor and singer)
- Bhakta Markandeya (1938)
- Vara Vikrayam (1939)
- Vande Mataram (1939)

== Bibliography ==
- Nata Ratnalu, Mikkilineni Radhakrishna Murthy, Second edition, 2002
- Luminaries of 20th Century, Potti Sreeramulu Telugu University, 2005
