= Satyanarayan (disambiguation) =

Satyanarayan is another name of Vishnu.

Satyanarayan or Satya Narayan may also refer to:

- B. Satya Narayan Reddy, Indian politician
- Satya Narayan Bohidar, Sambalpuri writer
- Satya Narayan Goenka, Burmese-Indian teacher of Vipassanā meditation
- Satya Narayan Sinha, Indian politician
- Satyanarayan Singh (disambiguation)
- Ulhas Koravi Satyanarayan, Indian basketball player

== See also ==
- Satyanarayana (disambiguation)
- Satya Narayan (disambiguation)
