= K. Satyanarayana =

K. Satyanarayana may refer to:

- Kaikala Satyanarayana (born 1935), Telugu film actor
- Koccharlakota Satyanarayana (1915–1969), Telugu film and stage actor
- K. Satyanarayana (academic), Indian scholar, editor and anti-caste activist
