= Vara Vikrayam (film) =

- Directed by: C. Pullayya
- Written by: Kallakoori Narayana Rao (story); Balijepalli Lakshmikanta Kavi (dialogues)
- Produced by: Chabria
- Starring: Pushpavalli; Bhanumathi; Balijepalli Lakshmikanta Kavi; Daita Gopalam; Sriranjani
- Cinematography: Biren De
- Edited by: Dharamvir
- Music by: Prabhala Satyanarayana
- Release date: 1939
- Running time: 194 min
- Country: India
- Language: Telugu

Vara Vikrayam (English: Bridegrooms' Sale) is a 1939 Telugu drama film directed by C. Pullayya. It is a reformist social film about the dowry system prevalent in British India. It is based on the novel and play of the same name by Kallakoori Narayana Rao. It is the debut film for Bhanumathi.

== Plot ==
The retired government official Purshottama Rao (Daita Gopalam) borrows money to get his eldest daughter Kalindi (Bhanumathi) married to an old-man named Lingaraju (Balijepalli). Lingaraju is a money lender and already married twice. Kalindi does not like this marriage and commits suicide before the marriage can take place. Lingaraju refuses to return the dowry money. Purshottama's second daughter Kamala (Pushpavalli) agrees to marry him. She drags her husband Lingaraju to the court of justice.

== Cast ==
Actor/Actress	Character
Pushpavalli	Kamala
Bhanumathi	Kalindi
Balijepalli Lakshmikanta Kavi	Lingaraju
Daita Gopalam	Purushothama Rao
Koccharlakota Satyanarayana	Basavaraju
Tungala Chalapathi Rao	Chalapathi Rao
Sriranjani	Bhramaramba
Dasari Kotiratnam	Subhadra
Peri Ramachandra Murthi	Perayya
M. Ramachandra Murthy	
J. Satyanarayana	Veerayya
A. Narayana Rao	Ghantayya
A. V. Subba Rao	Judge
A. Satyanarayana	Pleader
Subhadra	Annapoorna
