= Sri Krishna Leelalu (1935 film) =

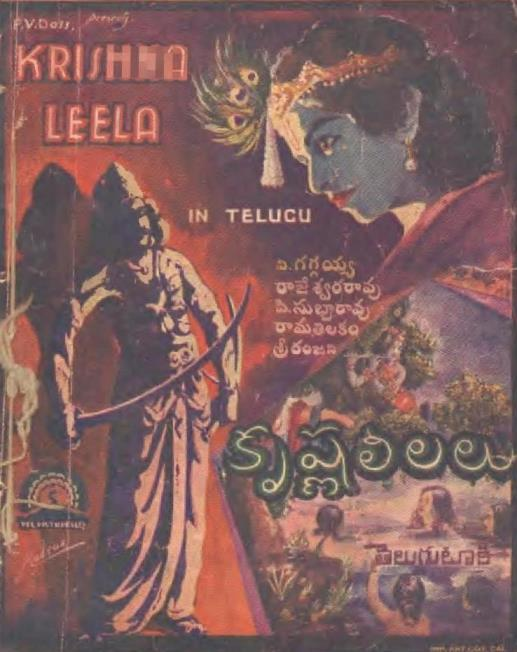
- Theatrical poster
- Directed by: Chitrapu Narasimha Rao
- Written by: Pingali Nagendra Rao; B. T. Raghavachari
- Produced by: Pinapala Venkata Dasu
- Starring: Saluri Rajeswara Rao; Vemuri Gaggayya; Ramatilakam; Sriranjani Sr. Parupalli Subba Rao
- Music by: Galipenchala Narasimha Rao
- Release date: 22 November 1935
- Country: India
- Language: Telugu

Sri Krishna Leelalu (English: Krishna's Mischiefs) is a 1935 Telugu-language mythological film directed by Chitrapu Narasimha Rao and produced by Pinapala Venkata Dasu (P. V. Doss) under the banner of Vel Pictures. The film playfully depicts the antics of the child Krishna (Saluri Rajeswara Rao), from his birth to his victory over the evil Kamsa (Vemuri Gaggayya). It marks the film debut of future composer Rajeswara Rao and is one of Gaggayya’s best-known films.

The cast also includes Ramathilakam, Sriranjani Sr., and Parupalli Subba Rao in pivotal roles. Notable contributions to the screenplay and dialogues came from Bukkapatnam Raghavacharyulu (B. T. Raghavachari) and Pingali Nagendra Rao, respectively, while Gali Penchala Narasimha Rao composed the music. The film was a commercial success.

== Plot ==
Tormented by the evil deeds of Kamsa and his followers, Bhudevi, Indra, and other deities offer prayers to Lord Vishnu at Brahma's behest. Vishnu assures them he will be born as Devaki's son to end their suffering. Meanwhile, a prophecy warns Kamsa that he will die at the hands of Devaki's eighth child. Alarmed, Kamsa imprisons Devaki and her husband Vasudeva, vowing to kill each of their children at birth. Despite his intentions, Vishnu himself appears to Devaki and Vasudeva, promising to be born as their child and informing them that Yogamaya, their saviour, is already born in Nanda’s house.

At midnight, Vasudeva secretly carries the newborn Krishna across the Yamuna River to Nanda's house, exchanging him for Yogamaya and returning to the prison. Kamsa attempts to kill the child but is warned by Yogamaya that Krishna, destined to kill him, is already born.

In Repalle, Krishna grows up causing mischief among the Gopikas, demonstrating miraculous feats and divine powers. He kills demons sent by Kamsa, including Putana, Chakrasura, and Trunavarta, and subdues the serpent Kaliya with forgiveness. Later, Kamsa summons Krishna and his brother Balarama to his court under the pretense of a ritual. Along their journey, the brothers kill the royal washerman, free Kubja from a curse, and destroy Kamsa's weapon storehouse. In the court, Krishna and Balarama defeat Kamsa's champions, Chanura and Mushtika, before finally confronting Kamsa himself. Krishna defeats and kills Kamsa, thus ending his tyranny.

== Cast ==
- Saluri Rajeswara Rao – Child Krishna
- Vemuri Gaggayya – Kamsa
- Ramathilakam – Yasoda
- Sriranjani Sr. – Devaki
- Parupalli Subba Rao – Vasudeva
- Parupalli Satyanarayana – Akrura
- Master Avadhani – Balarama
- Lakshmirajyam – Radha

== Crew ==
- Screenplay – B.T. Raghavachari
- Dialogues – Pingali Nagendra Rao
- Music – Gali Penchala Narasimha Rao
- Producer – Pinapala Venkata Dasu (P. V. Doss)
- Director – Chitrapu Narasimha Rao
- Banner: Vel Pictures
- Release Date: 22 November 1935

== Production ==
Saluri Rajeswara Rao, cast as the young Krishna, was already recognized as a child prodigy. From the age of four, he performed on stage, later training in tabla and harmonium under Dwaram Venkataswamy Naidu. In 1935, at age 13, Rajeswara Rao was chosen by Vel Pictures to portray Krishna in Sri Krishna Leelalu, which was primarily filmed in Calcutta. He would later star in other mythological films, such as Keechaka Vadha and Uttara Gograhanam, with his father accompanying him to play mrudangam for these productions.

== Music ==
The soundtrack for Sri Krishna Leelalu was composed by Gali Penchala Narasimha Rao and features a variety of songs and poems that reflect the mythological theme of the film. Notable tracks include:

"Aura Loka Hithakari" song from Sri Krishna Leelalu

- "Vinodambau Naaku Nayanaa" – P. Ramathilakam
- "Jojojo Komala Shyamala" – P. Ramathilakam
- "Aura Lokahitakari" – S. Rajeswara Rao
- "Deenavanudane Jagatin" – S. Rajeswara Rao
- Dialogues and Songs – S. Rajeswara Rao, Vemuri Gaggayya
- "Kshatra Dharmamu Raajyakamsha Gavuna" (Poem) – Vemuri Gaggayya
- "Thikkaaramunu Saituna Kutilajana" – Vemuri Gaggayya
- "Pranathulive Kamsa Bhoopatikin" (Poem) – S. Rajeswara Rao
- "Menalluni Mammu Bilchutaku" (Poem) – S. Rajeswara Rao
- "Ahaa Madikedi Sukhamu Gocharimpadaye"
- "Elaa Madilo Bheti Jenden Baaluleela"
- "Kanaledu Neevu Vinaledu Neevu Vanitha" – P. Ramathilakam
- "Anna Sramimpumanna Thagadal Ludu" (Poem) – Sriranjani
- "Annavu Neevu Chellelikikku Akata" (Poem) – Parupalli Subbarao
- "Amma Mannudinangane Sisuvuno" (Poem)
- "Aaray Nathamaamulu Mahaatmulu" (Poem)
- "Emi Choochidu Veenii Purnendu Vadana" (Poem) – Parupalli Subbarao
