= Brahma Ratham =

1947 film by Chitrapu Narayana Rao

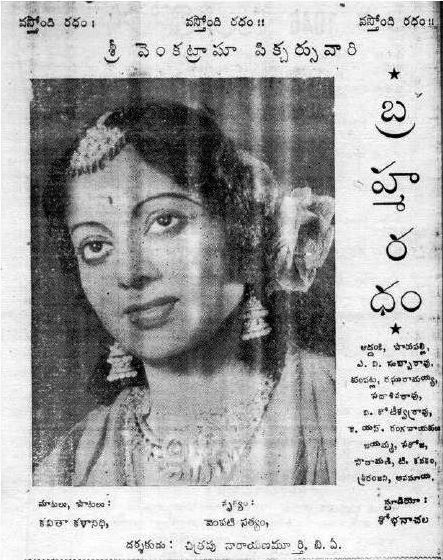
- Brahmaratham 1947 Poster
- Directed by: Chitrapu Narayana Rao
- Written by: Balijepalli Lakshmikantam
- Produced by: Mirjapuram Maharaja
- Starring: K. Raghuramaiah; Addanki Srirama Murthy; C. Krishnaveni; B. Jayamma
- Music by: Moti Babu
- Production company: Sobhanachala studios
- Release date: 1947
- Country: India
- Language: Telugu

Brahma Ratham is a 1947 Telugu drama film directed by Chitrapu Narayana Rao. It is based on the novel of the same name written by Balijepalli Lakshmikantam.

== Cast ==
- K. Raghuramaiah
- Addanki Srirama Murthy
- C. Krishnaveni
- B. Jayamma
- Parupalli Subba Rao
- A. V. Subba Rao
- Kumpatla
- Koteswara Rao
- Nagamani
- Rama Rao
- Saroja
- T. Kanakam
- Sriranjani
- Anasuya
