= Vara Vikrayam =

Indian work of fiction

Vara Vikrayam వరవిక్రయం
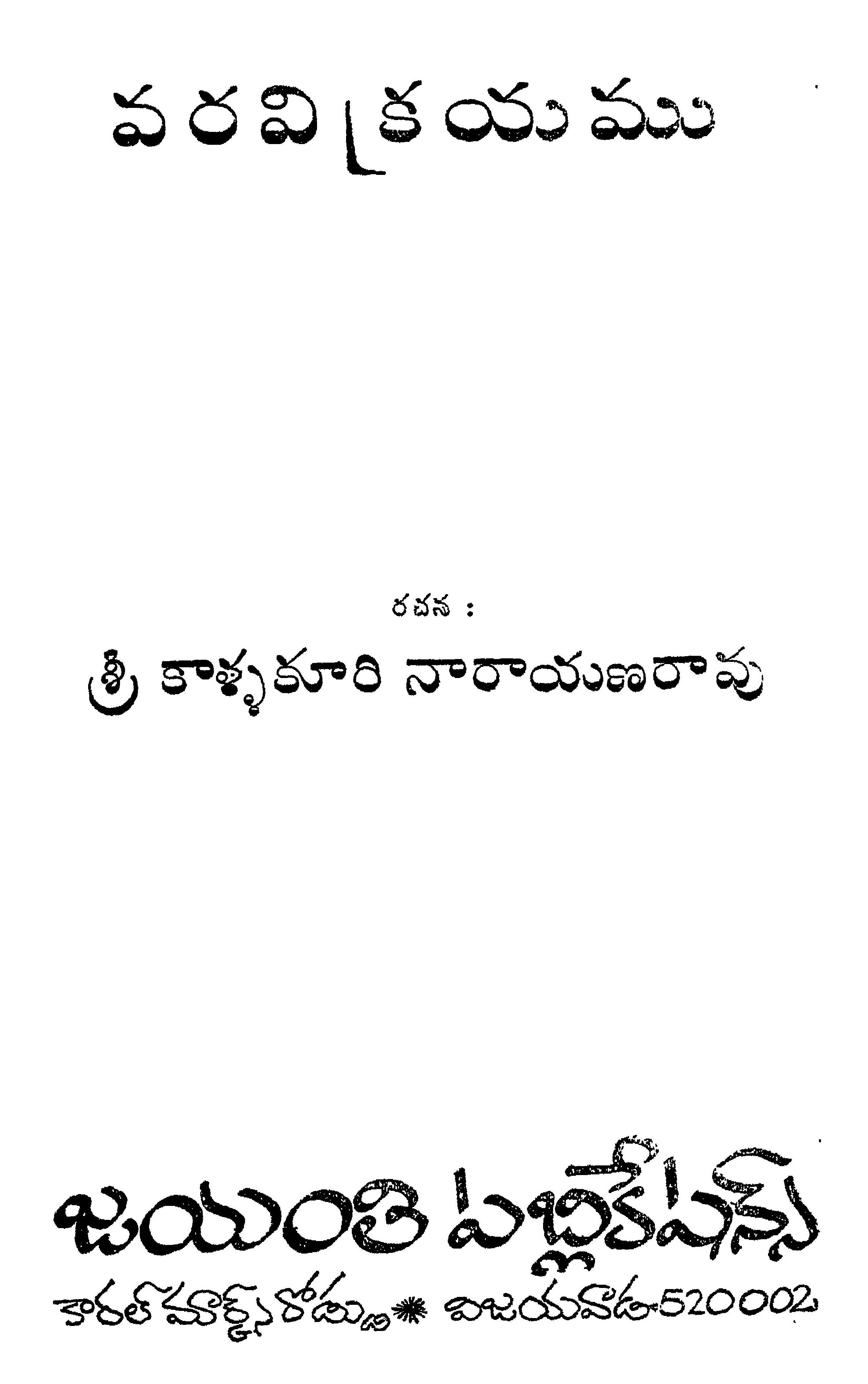
- Cover of Vara Vikrayam
- Original language: Telugu
- Written by: Kallakoori Narayana Rao
- Characters: Purushotham Rao; Kalindi; Kamala; Singaraju Lingaraju; Basavaraju; Vengalappa
- Subject: Dowry system
- Genre: Social reform

Vara Vikrayam (Telugu: వర విక్రయం) is a famous novel and play with same name by Kallakoori Narayana Rao. It is based on a reformist social theme about the Dowry system prevalent in India.

== Main characters ==
- Pradhana Patralu
- Purushotham Rao, Revenue inspector
- Kalindi, elder daughter of Purushotham Rao
- Kamala, younger daughter of Purushotham Rao
- Singaraju Lingaraju
- Basavaraju, adopted son of Singaraju Lingaraju
- Vengalappa
- Veerayya

== The plot ==
Purshottama Rao is a retired government official. He has two daughters. He borrows money to get his elder daughter Kalindi married to an greedy money lender Lingaraju's educated son. Kalindi does not like this marriage and commits suicide before the marriage. Lingaraju refuses to return the dowry money. Purshottama's second daughter Kamala agrees to marry him. She drags her father-in-law Lingaraju to court of justice.

The film Subhalekha directed by K.Viswanath has similarities with this film.

== Publications ==
It is published for the first time in 1921. Kondapalli Veeravenkaiah and Sons, Rajahmundry published the play in 1947. It has been published in 1993 by Jayanthi Publishers, Vijayawada.

== The 1939 film ==
Vara Vikrayam was made in 1939 as a Telugu film directed by Chittajallu Pullayya starring Bhanumathi Ramakrishna. Balijepalli Lakshmikantham portrayed the key role of Singaraju Lingaraju.
