= America Alludu =

- Poster
- Directed by: K. Vasu
- Written by: Satyanand (dialogues)
- Screenplay by: K. Vasu
- Story by: Velcheru Narayana Rao
- Produced by: Srilatha Vemuri; Ramesh Babu Vemuri
- Starring: Suman; Bhanupriya
- Cinematography: M. V. Raghu
- Edited by: Nayani Maheshwara Rao
- Music by: K. Chakravarthy
- Production company: Chicago Films
- Release date: 7 June 1985
- Country: India
- Language: Telugu

America Alludu (transl. American son-in-law) is a 1985 Indian Telugu-language romantic drama film directed by K. Vasu and starring Suman and Bhanupriya.

== Plot ==
Raju, a doctor in Chicago, marries his maradalu (transl. cross cousin) Radha from the village. However, Radha is unable to adjust to the western lifestyle and frequently makes Raju uncomfortable. Due to a mistake made by Radha, a patient dies in Raju's hospital. With this, Raju leaves Radha and goes back to India. Radha single handedly takes care of their child. How Radha wins back Raju's heart forms the rest of the story.

== Cast ==
- Suman as Dr. Raju (voice dubbed by P. Sai Kumar)
- Bhanupriya as Radha
- Kim as Mary
- Kantha Rao as Raghava Rao
- Dr. Tambu as Dr. Prakash Rao
- Suryakantham as Kanakadurgamma
- Janaki as Parvathamma
- Chidatala Apparao as the postman
- Mukku Raju as the dance master
- K. Vasu as America Apparao
- Vemana Jampala as Raju and Radha's son

Uncredited

- Nannaya Jamapala as Young Raju and Radha's son
- Mutyala Padmasri (cameo appearance)

The rest of the cast consists of Chicago-based artistes: Mutyala Padmasri, Prasanna, Sujatha, Chowdary, John Jones, and Ron.

== Production ==
=== Development and casting ===
The film was produced by Chicago-based Dr. Ramesh Babu Vemuri. He paid an advance to Jandhyala, who eventually could not do the film since he did not have a visa. Vemuri asked K. Vasu to direct the film since he was already in the United States on vacation with a different story and cast. Vasu's acting role was initially supposed to be played by Rallapalli, but he did not have a passport.

=== Filming ===
N. T. Rama Rao, who was in the United States for bypass surgery, was present at the film's muhurat shot. The film was shot for fifteen days in the United States mostly in Ramesh and his friends' houses and O'Hare International Airport in the Chicago metropolitan area apart from Buffalo, Grand Canyon, Las Vegas (Hoover Dam), Los Angeles (Disneyland and Hollywood), Niagara Falls and Washington D. C. The climax shot in Elgin featured a car chase of three cars. Twenty backup cars were arranged for each car in case of an accident. While shooting at the Lincoln Memorial, the film crew was asked to show their film permit, and since they did not have it, stills were taken and used in the film. The village scenes were canned in ten days in Kovur, India. The song "Naa Vaalujada Krishnaveni" was supposed to be shot in United States as per the story, but since Suman and Bhanupriya were busy and the shooting for this film exceeded the fifteen day period, the song was shot at AVM Studios in India.

== Soundtrack ==
The music was composed by K. Chakravarthy. All songs were written by Veturi except for "Tene Vennela Neeli Minnulaa" was written by NRI Velcheru Narayana Rao. The song "Nee Vente Nenuntaa" is based on Laura Branigan's version of "Self Control", and was the first Telugu song to be made in the United States and feature graphics.

Track listing
| No. | Title | Singer(s) | Length |
|---|---|---|---|
| 1. | "Gomaata Maa Amma Godaari Gangamma" | P. Susheela |
| 2. | "Tene Vennela Neeli Minnulaa" | S. P. Balasubrahmanyam, S. Janaki |
| 3. | "Aalantu Annaaka Mogudantu Unnaaka" | P. Susheela |
| 4. | "Nee Vente Nenuntaa" | S. P. Balasubrahmanyam, S. P. Sailaja |
| 5. | "Naa Vaalujada Krishnaveni" | P. Susheela |
| 6. | "Pranayama Pralayama" | S. P. Sailaja |

== Release ==
The film was expected to release at the end of March 1985, but was delayed to 7 June 1985. The film was a box office success and ran for a hundred days in ten theatres.
