= Viswa Mohini =

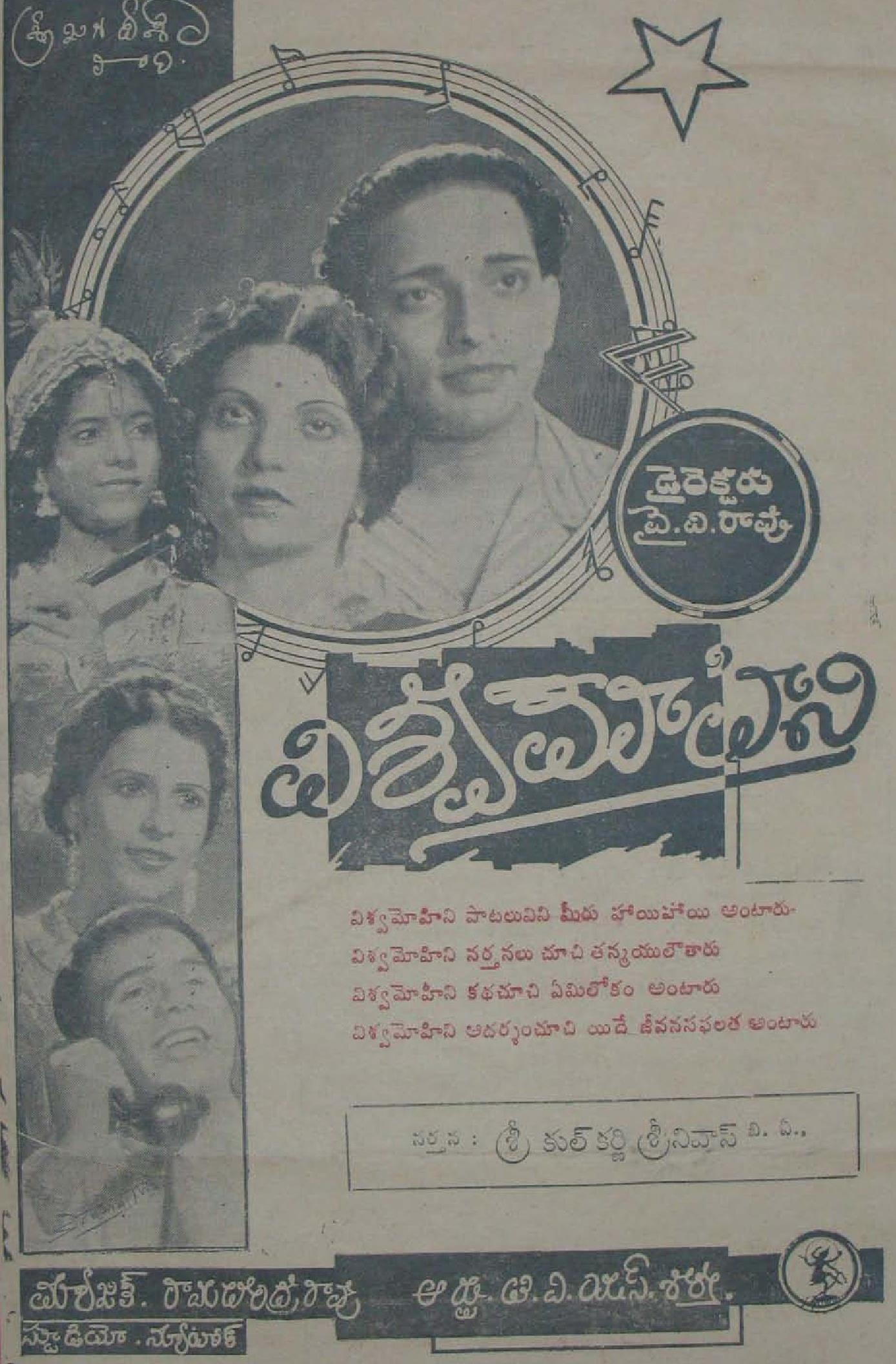
- Theatrical release poster
- Directed by: Y. V. Rao
- Screenplay by: Balijepalli Lakshmikanta Kavi
- Story by: Y. V. Rao
- Produced by: Y. V. Rao
- Starring: V. Nagayya; Y. V. Rao; Pushpavalli; Gohar Mamajiwala; Lalitha
- Cinematography: Pandurang Naik; Chandulal Shah
- Edited by: Y. V. Rao
- Music by: Ogirala Ramachandra Rao
- Production companies: Newton Studios; Lakshmi Studios
- Distributed by: Sri Jagadesh Films
- Release date: November 9, 1940
- Running time: 195 minutes
- Country: India
- Language: Telugu

Viswa Mohini (transl. The World of Entertainment) is a 1940 Telugu-language romantic thriller film in the backdrop of Indian motion picture world, directed by Y. V. Rao. The ensemble cast starring V. Nagayya was written by Balijepalli Lakshmikanta Kavi, and was screened at the Venice Film Festival. The production design was handled by T. V. S. Sarma, and cinematography was handled by Pandurang Naik.

It is the first Indian film to be made about the movie world. The film was released in 1940, and turned out to be a mediocre success.

== Plot ==
Mohan Rao, who works for a law firm in Madras, cheats his Manager Padmanabham, and becomes the owner of the company through illegal means. Mohan Rao is the son of Padmanabham's business rival Purushothama Rao. He plans his son Mohan Rao's marriage with Hemalatha, the daughter of a wealthy widow Visalakshi who happens to be Puroshothama Rao's neighbour. But Mohan Rao is not interested in this alliance.

Pasupathi, a renowned filmmaker and friend of Mohan Rao, lures him to popular actress Viswamohini on the sets of a film shooting. Viswamohini is the daughter of the same Padmanabham whom Mohan Rao cheated. Mohan Rao develops a secret affair with Viswamohini, and expresses his wish to marry her. Padmanabham is unaware of the fact that Mohan Rao is the son of his arch rival Purushotham.

Meanwhile, Pasupathi lures the wealthy Visalakshi into film production and distribution. Visalakshi loses all her wealth in the process. In a twist of fate, Padmanabham is shocked to know through Hemalatha that Mohan Rao is the son of Purushotham. How Padmanabham deals with the situation, and how he becomes aware of Mohan Rao's criminal deeds, and Pasupathi's ulterior motive forms the rest of the plot.

== Cast ==
- V. Nagayya
- Y. V. Rao
- Pushpavalli
- Gohar Mamajiwala
- Lalitha
- Bezawada Rajarathnam
- T. Suryanarayana
- Doraiswamy
- Cocanada Rajarathnam
- P. Ganga Rathnam
- Rangaswamy
- Sampurna

== Soundtrack ==
The lyrics for the soundtrack were written by Balijepalli Lakshmikantha Kavi, the songs were choreographed by Srinivasa Kulakarni.

- "Melavimpagade Cheliya Veena"
- "Bhale Face Beautiful Nee Pose"
- "Yee Poo Podarinta"

== Release and reception ==
The film had an unprecedented release in 1940 at 11 centers in Madras Presidency, and turned out to be a mediocre success.
