= Atapaka =

- village
- Interactive map of Atapaka
- Location in Andhra Pradesh, India
- Coordinates: 16.5605°N 81.2285°E
- Country: India
- State: Andhra Pradesh
- District: Eluru

Government
  - Type: Panchayat raj
  - Body: Gram panchayat

Population (2011)
  - Total: 5,460

Languages
  - Official: Telugu
- Time zone: UTC+5:30 (IST)
- Vehicle registration: AP

Atapaka is a village in Kaikaluru mandal of Eluru district, Andhra Pradesh, India.

== Demographics ==
According to Indian census, 2001, the demographic details of Atapaka mandal is as follows:

- Total Population: 4,883 in 1,144 Households
- Male Population: 2,453 and Female Population: 2,430
- Children Under 6-years of age: 655 (Boys - and Girls - 331)
- Total Literates: 3,035

== Eminent persons ==
- Banda Kanakalingeshwara Rao, famous Telugu drama and film actor was born here.
