= Koccharlakota Satyanarayana =

Indian actor

Koccharlakota Sathyanarayana
- Born: 2 April 1915; West Godavari district, British India
- Died: 21 December 1969 (aged 54); Eluru, Andhra Pradesh
- Occupations: actor, playback singer

Koccharlakota Satyanarayana (2 April 1915 - 1969) was a Telugu film and drama actor and playback singer during the early period of Telugu cinema.

He was born into a Zamindari family in West Godavari district, Andhra Pradesh. His childhood was spent with his grandparents at Bhimadole during the 1910s. He liked sitting before the gramophone and used to sing along. While in Rajahmundry, during his high school days he joined Kesari Samajam of Machiraju Ramachandra Murthy and started acting in stage plays. He staged Chintamani and Pratapa Rudreeyam and used to donate that money to schools and libraries.

He entered the cinema field with Draupadi Vastrapaharanam of Saraswati Talkies. He acted as Krishna in Jarasandha, Basavaraju in Vara Vikrayam, Malli Pelli of Y. V. Rao and as Lakshmana in Paduka Pattabhishekam.

He shifted to the Dramatic field and acted with Vemuri Gaggayya and Sthanam Narasimha Rao in the plays Jarasandha, Sarangadhara and Tulabaram. He later joined Prabhat Theatres of Banda Kanakalingeswara Rao and acted as Arjununa in Pandava, Vengala Rao in Bobbili Yudham, Satyavan in Sati Savitri, Bhavani Shankar in Chintamani and as Kalidas in Kalidas. He acted in Ramanjaneya Yudham as Lord Rama with Betha Venkata Rao.

He died on 21 December 1969 in Eluru.

== Filmography ==
- Seeta Kalyanam (1934) (actor)
- Draupadi Vastrapaharanam (1936) as Sahadeva (actor)
- Jarasandha (1938) as Krishna (actor)
- Malli Pelli (1939) as Venkata Rao (actor and playback singer)
- Vara Vikrayam (1939) as Basavaraju (actor)
- Paduka Pattabhishekam (1945) as Lakshmana (actor)
