= Naan Kanda Sorgam =

1960 film directed by C. Pullaiah

- Poster
- Directed by: C. Pullayya
- Written by: K. S. Gopalakrishnan (dialogues)
- Story by: Dinabandhu Mitra
- Produced by: C. Pullayya
- Starring: K. A. Thangavelu; Sowcar Janaki
- Cinematography: Nanjappa; P. S. Loganathan
- Music by: G. Aswathama
- Production company: Bharghavi Films
- Release date: 12 August 1960
- Country: India
- Language: Tamil

Naan Kanda Sorgam (transl. My Heaven) is a 1960 Indian Tamil-language fantasy comedy film directed and produced by C. Pullayya. The film stars K. A. Thangavelu and Sowcar Janaki. It is a remake of the 1958 Bengali film Jamalaye Jibanta Manush, and was simultaneously filmed in Telugu as Devanthakudu with a largely different cast. The film was released on 12 August 1960 and became a commercial success.

== Plot ==
Meenakshi is the daughter of Parama Pillai, a miserly millionaire. While she is drawn to public service, her father despises the idea. Meenakshi falls in love with Sundar, a theatre artiste who donates whatever he earns to impoverished people. Parama Pillai despises him but, unknown to him, his daughter assists Sundar in his social welfare activities. When Parama Pillai realises this, he forbids Meenakshi to leave the house and even appoints two men to guard her. Sundar disguises himself as a woman and fools the millionaire into appointing him as Meenakshi's tutor. When Parama Pillai arranges Meenakshi's marriage with an older rich man, Sundar saves her by helping her escape. Parama Pillai finds his daughter and locks her up, beating Sundar almost to death. The rest of the film deals with how Yama, Vishnu and other gods help Meenakshi and Sundar unite.

== Cast ==
- K. A. Thangavelu as Sundar
- Sowcar Janaki as Meenakshi
- Alwar Kuppuswamy as Parama Pillai
- M. S. Sundari Bai as Parama Pillai's wife
- S. V. Ranga Rao as Yama
- P. V. Narasimha Bharathi as Narada

== Production ==
Naan Kanda Sorgam was produced and directed by C. Pullayya under the banner Bharghavi Films. It was remade from the 1958 Bengali film Jamalaye Jibanta Manush, itself based on a play by Dinabandhu Mitra, and simultaneously filmed in Telugu as Devanthakudu with a largely different cast. K. S. Gopalakrishnan wrote the dialogues. Nanjappa, assisted by P. S. Loganathan, handled the cinematography. Shooting for the film took place at Vijaya-Vauhini Studios. The film featured an apsara dance sequence choreographed by Gemini Ramamurthi.

== Soundtrack ==
G. Aswathama composed the film's music. The film had a dance-drama called "Usha Parinayam" for which P. B. Sreenivas and S. Janaki lent their voices.

| Song | Singer | Lyrics | Length |
|---|---|---|---|
| "Kizhavan Vadivodu Kaana Vandhaan" | S. Janaki | K. S. Gopalakrishnan | 03:35 |
| "Ungal Azhagai Kanden" | Seerkazhi Govindarajan, S. Janaki] | K. S. Gopalakrishnan | 03:54 |
| "Ulagamellam Irundathu Pol" | Seerkazhi Govindarajan, S. Janaki] | K. S. Gopalakrishnan | 03:39 |
| "Jodhimi Dhim Dhimi Dhimi Enru Aadalum" | P. B. Srinivas | K. S. Gopalakrishnan | 01:18 |
| "Thaamarai Kannaa" | C. S. Jayaraman | T. K. Sundara Vadhyar | 01:46 |
| "Vandarai Vaazha Vazhi Kaattum" | C. S. Jayaraman | T. K. Sundara Vadhyar | |
| "Parama Kirupa Nandana" | V. N. Sundaram | T. K. Sundara Vadhyar | |
| "Ilamai Maaraadha Inbam" | P. Leela, N. L. Ganasaraswathi | Thanjai N. Ramaiah Dass | 05:31 |
| "Paar Paar Sambaaru" | Seerkazhi Govindarajan, S. Janaki | Thanjai N. Ramaiah Dass | 04:36 |
| "Kanavondru Kanden Sakiye" | P. B. Srinivas, S. Janaki | Parthiban | |

== Release and reception ==
Naan Kanda Sorgam was released on 12 August 1960. The Indian Express said, "A hilarious comedy in the best tradition of Tamil genius has been brought to the screen by the plucky Producer-Director C. Pullayya in Nan Kanda Swargam." Kanthan of Kalki lauded Thangavelu's performance, saying it brought the feel of heaven. According to historian Randor Guy, the film was a commercial success "mainly because of the unusual story line and fantasy elements."
