= Savithiri (1941 film) =

Savithri
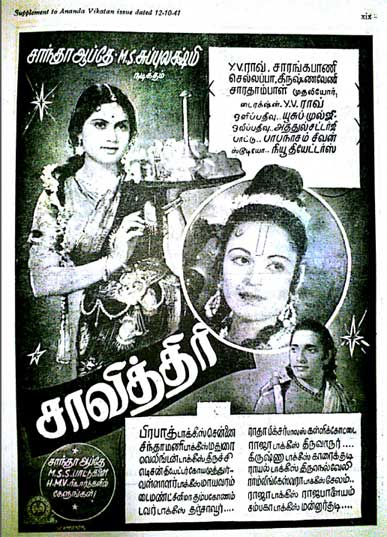
- Film poster
- Directed by: Y. V. Rao
- Screenplay by: T. C. Vadivelu Nayakar
- Based on: Savitri and Satyavan a story from Mahabharata
- Starring: Shanta Apte; M. S. Subbulakshmi; Y. V. Rao; V. A. Chellappa
- Cinematography: Yusuf Mulji
- Edited by: N. M. Shankar
- Music by: M. Rajagopala Sharma; Kamal Das Gupta
- Production company: New Theatres Studio
- Distributed by: Rayal Talkie Distributors of Madura
- Release date: 4 September 1941
- Country: India
- Language: Tamil

Savithiri is a 1941 Indian Tamil-language film directed by Y. V. Rao. The film featured himself as Satyavan and Shanta Apte as Savitri.

== Plot ==
Savithiri is a beautiful and chaste princess. Princes in the neighbouring Kingdoms are intimidated by her beauty and purity and no one wants to marry her. Savithiri's father King Aswapati tells her to go out and find her own husband. She finds a young man, Sathyavan, who is the son of a blind king now living in the forest in exile. Savithiri brings the young man to her Kingdom. In the meantime, Narada tells Asvapati that Savithiri has made a bad choice because Sathyavan is destined to die in one year. However, Savithiri insists on marrying Sathyavan. The king finally agrees and they are married. Savithiri goes to live with her husband in the forest. She takes to a life of austerities. On the day Sathyavan is to die, she accompanies him into the forest to cut firewood. While he was cutting a tree, Sathyavan collapses. Yama comes and takes his soul. Savithiri follows Yama but Yama tells her not to follow him. But she insists and talks about Dharma with Yama. Finally, Yama is impressed by her talks and tells her to ask any boon except the life of Sathyavan. First she asks for eyesight to her father-in-law and the restoration of his Kingdom. Then she asks for an heir to her father's Kingdom and finally she asks for 100 children to herself. This places Yama in a dilemma. If she is to have 100 children, then Sathiyavan must live to give her those children. Fully impressed by this virtuous woman's arguments, Yama returns the life of Sathyawan.

== Cast ==
The list is adapted from the film titles (See External links)

Male cast

- Y. V. Rao as Sathyavan
- V. A. Chellappa as Yamadarman
- K. Sarangapani as Sumali
- K. Doraisamy as Thyumathsenan
- P. Sundar Rao as Aswapathi
- T. S. Durairaj as Santhana Sharma
- Shripada Shankar as Minister
- M. R. Durairaj as Kadakethu
- P. S. Ramudu as Mannar Chetty
- Jaganatha Iyengar as Chitraguptan
- Sriramulu, Anandan as Sage's Sons

Female cast

- Shanta Apte as Savithiri
- M. S. Subbulakshmi as Narada
- P. Bhanumathi as Malavi Devi
- Golden Saradambal as Padmavathi Devi
- T. S. Krishnaveni as Madanika
- S. R. Lakshmi as Nirmala

== Production ==
Shanta Apte was a popular Marathi and Hindi star. She did not know Tamil, but insisted that she will learn the language and lend her own voice in the film. She studied under a tutor in Pune for one year and became proficient in the language. M. S. Subbulakshmi was cast in the role of Narada, a male Vedic Sage. The film was produced in New Theatres Studio in Calcutta (now Kolkata).

== Soundtrack ==
Music was composed by M. Rajagopala Sharma while Kamal Das Gupta was in charge of orchestration. "Bruhi Muhundeti" is a kriti by Sadasiva Brahmendra. Other lyrics were penned by Papanasam Sivan.

| S/N | Song | Singer/s | Duration (m:ss) |
|---|---|---|---|
| 1 | "Bruhi Mukundethi Rasane" | M. S. Subbulakshmi | 02:17 |
| 2 | "Maname Kanamum" | M. S. Subbulakshmi | 01:55 |
| 3 | "Aggini Endrariyayo Karpudaya Mangayarai" | M. S. Subbulakshmi | 02:34 |
| 4 | "Deviyai Poojai Seivay" | M. S. Subbulakshmi | 02:08 |
| 5 | "Mangalamum Peruvar" | M. S. Subbulakshmi | 02:10 |
| 6 | "Sollu Kulandaai" | M. S. Subbulakshmi | 03:21 |
| 7 | "Deviyai Poojai Seivai" | M. S. Subbulakshmi | 03:30 |
| 8 | "Jayadeviye Jagadambike Karunaiyai Arulvai Devi" | Shanta Apte | 02:17 |
| 9 | "Anandamaana Ullasamudan Villaiyaduvom Paduvom Paattugalai" | Shanta Apte | 01:54 |
| 10 | "Ado Devi, Ado Pogiran.. Iha Para Sukhamum" | Shanta Apte | 02:43 |
| 11 | "Maaye, Yenadu Thaye" | Shanta Apte | 01:59 |
| 12 | "Kulamigu Piraviyin" | Shanta Apte | 02:19 |
| 13 | "Naadhan Uyirkku Mandraadum" | V. A. Chellappa | 02:54 |

== Release ==
Savithiri was released on 4 September 1941 at Madurai, Trichy and Coimbatore. In Madras it was released on 17 October.

== Reception ==
The film did not fare well in the box-office. Film historian Randor Guy said the film is remembered for "the fine performances of MS, Rao, Chellappa and Shantha Apte, and MS's songs many of which became hits."
