= Sathyanarayana Raju (disambiguation) =

Sathyanarayana Raju most often refers to Indian spiritual guru Sathya Sai Baba.

Sathyanarayana Raju or Satyanarayana Raju may also refer to:

- Alluri Satyanarayana Raju, Indian freedom fighter and politician
- Alluri Venkata Sathyanarayana Raju (born 1937), Indian industrialist and chairman of Nagarjuna Construction Company Ltd.
- Datla Satyanarayana Raju (1904–1973), Indian physician and parliamentarian
- K. Satyanarayana Raju, Indian politician
- Penmetsa Satyanarayana Raju (1908–1966), former Chief Justice of Andhra Pradesh High Court
