= Paduka Pattabhishekam =

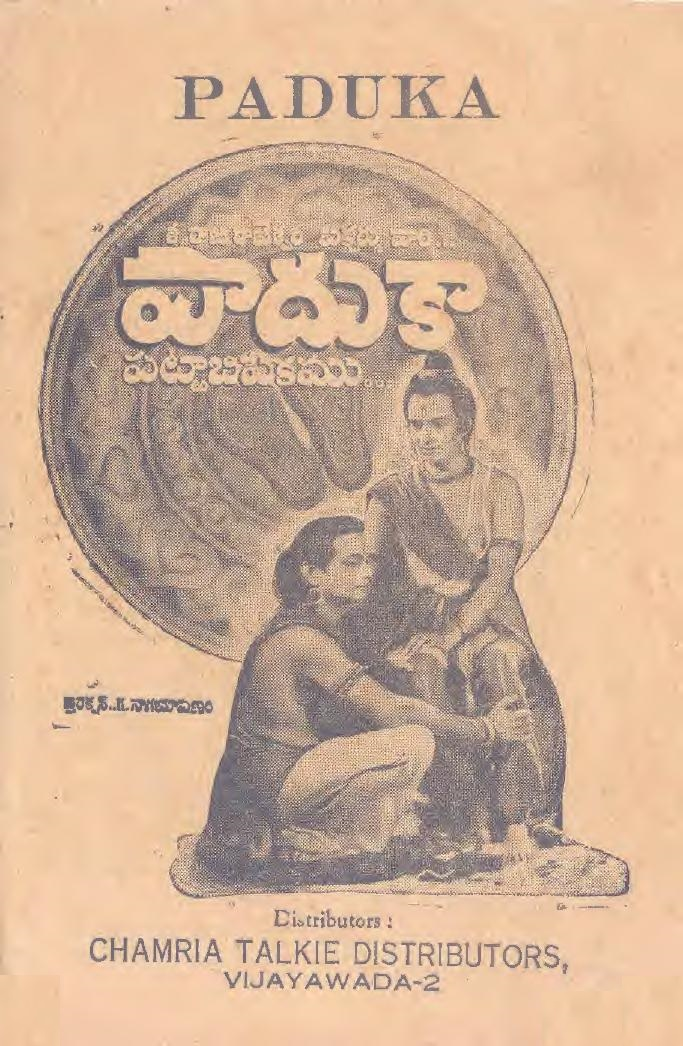
- Poster of Paduka Pattabhishekam
- Directed by: Kadaru Nagabhushanam
- Written by: Panuganti Lakshminarasimha Rao (story); Sriramula Sacchidananda Sastry (dialogues)
- Produced by: Kadaru Nagabhushanam
- Starring: C. S. R. Anjaneyulu; Pushpavalli
- Cinematography: Kamal Ghosh
- Music by: S. Rajeswara Rao
- Production company: Gemini Studios
- Release date: 1945
- Country: India
- Language: Telugu

Paduka Pattabhishekam is a 1945 Indian Telugu-language film directed and produced by Kadaru Nagabhushanam.

== Plot ==
The story of the film is from the Hindu epic Ramayana. According to his father's wish, Rama goes to the forest with Sita and Lakshmana. Bharata instead of becoming the crown king, as per his mother's wish, goes to the forest and requests Rama to return to Ayodhya. Refusing to disobey the orders of their father, he gives away his Padukas to Bharata. Taking them back to Ayodhya, he crowns them and rules the kingdom for 14 years.

== Remake ==
It was remade in 1966, starring Kantha Rao.

== Cast ==
- CSR Anjaneyulu ... Lord Rama
- Pushpavalli ... Goddess Sita
- Banda Kanakalingeshwara Rao ... Bharata
- Addanki Srirama Murthy ... Dasaratha
- Kannamba ... Kaikeyi
- Koccharlakota Satyanarayana ... Lakshmana
