= Y. V. Rao =

Indian director, producer, actor (1903–1979)

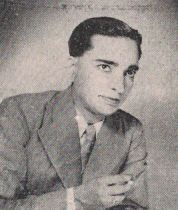
- Y. V. Rao in 1948
- Born: Yaragudipati Varada Rao; 30 May 1903; Nellore, Madras Presidency, British India
- Died: 13 February 1979 (aged 75); Madras, Tamil Nadu, India
- Occupations: Film director; producer; actor; screenwriter; editor
- Years active: 1930–1968
- Spouse(s): Rajam, Kumari Rukmani
- Children: Lakshmi
- Relatives: Aishwariyaa Bhaskaran (granddaughter)

Yaragudipati Varada Rao (30 May 1903 – 13 February 1979) was an Indian director, actor, screenwriter, and editor known for his works primarily in Telugu, Kannada, and Tamil films. Rao started his career in theatre and did a few stage plays before moving to Kolhapur and Bombay to act in silent films. He started his career as a lead actor in many silent films such as Gajendra Moksham (1923), Garuda Garvabhangam (1929), and Rose of Rajasthan (1931). Regarded as one of the greatest filmmaking pioneers of the Cinema of South India, he made motion-pictures across Telugu, Kannada, Tamil, Konkani, and Hindi languages, apart from silent films.

Rao made significant contributions to South cinema during the British rule in India. Rao's 1934 film Sati Sulochana was the first talkie film in the Kannada language. In 1937, he directed the hagiographical classic Chintamani, the Tamil sleeper hit ran for a year with highest estimated footfall at a single screen in India, and British Ceylon. Rao's 1938 film Swarnalatha was one of the finest political drama scripted by Ayyalu Somayajulu; with prohibition as the central theme, in which Rao played the lead. The film was shot extensively at Newtone Studios, Kilpauk, during Madras Presidency. Rao's 1940 film, Viswa Mohini, is the first Indian film, depicting the Indian movie world, scripted by Balijepalli Lakshmikanta Kavi, starring V. Nagayya. Rao subsequently made the mythology sequel films Savithiri (1941), and Sathyabhama (1942) casting thespian Sthanam Narasimha Rao.

== Personal life ==
Yaragudipati Varada Rao was born in Telugu Brahmin family of Nellore in the then Madras Presidency of India in May 1903. In the late 1920s, he moved to Madras and ventured into Kannada cinema. He married Kumari Rukmini who was paired with him in Lavangi (1946). Indian actress Lakshmi is their daughter.

== Early career ==
Rao moved into film direction and made silent films such as Pandava Nirvan (1930), Pandava Agnathavaas (1930) and Hari Maya (1932). In 1932, a Marwari businessman, Chamanlal Doongaji from Bangalore, launched South India Movie Tone. The company made Sati Sulochana, the first talking picture in Kannada with an expense of ₹40,000 (equivalent to ₹14 million or US$140,000 in 2023). Rao directed this blockbuster film shot at Chatrapathi Cinetone, in Kolhapur; the shooting took eight weeks. He then directed Hari Maya (1932) that starred his first wife, Rajam.

== Selected filmography ==
As Director

- 1930: Pandava Agyathavas (silent)
- 1930: Sarangadhara (silent)
- 1932: Hari Maya (Kannada - Director)
- 1934: Sati Sulochana (Kannada - Cast)
- 1935: Naganand (Hindi)
- 1936: Bhama Parinayam (Tamil)
- 1937: Chintamani (Tamil)
- 1938: Bhakta Meera (Tamil)
- 1938: Swarnalatha (Tamil)
- 1939: Malli Pelli (Telugu - Cast)
- 1940: Viswa Mohini (Telugu - Cast)
- 1941: Savithiri (Tamil - Cast, Singer)
- 1942: Sathyabhama (Telugu - Cast)
- 1944: Thasildar (Telugu - Cast)
- 1946: Lavangi (Tamil)
- 1948: Ramadas (Tamil)
- 1950: Jeevit Amche Ashe (Konkani)
- 1952: Manavathi (Telugu-Tamil)
- 1953: Manjari (Telugu - Cast)
- 1956: Bhagya Chakra (Kannada)
- 1958: Sri Krishna Garudi (Telugu)
- 1961: Nagarjuna (Telugu-Kannada)
- 1963: Hennina Balu Kanneru (Kannada)
- 1973: Stree (Telugu)
