= Lavangi =

- Theatrical release poster
- Directed by: Y. V. Rao
- Screenplay by: P. R. Narayanan
- Story by: P. R. Narayanan
- Starring: Y. V. Rao; Kumari Rukmani
- Cinematography: Jiten Bannerji; Purushothan
- Music by: Subbaraman; Padmanabha Shastri
- Production company: Sri Jagadish Films
- Distributed by: Chandralekha
- Release date: 10 May 1946
- Country: India
- Language: Tamil

Lavangi is a 1946 Indian Tamil-language film directed and produced by Y. V. Rao and written by P. R. Narayanan. It stars Y. V. Rao, Kumari Rukmani, B. R. Panthulu, B. Jayamma, K. Sarangapani, K. R. Chellam and T. R. Ramachandran. The film features music by C. R. Subbu Raman.

== Plot ==
Kameswari has been separated from her husband, Jagannatha for twelve years, enduring poverty, agony, and blackmail.

== Cast ==
Credits adapted from the film's songbook

Male cast

- Y. V. Rao as Jagannatha Panditharajan
- B. R. Panthulu as Shah Jahan
- Rangaswami as Perubhattar
- K. Sarangapani as Muthanna
- T. R. Ramachandran as Gopu
- Sundar Rao as Appaiah Dikshithar
- Kasivishwanathan as Battoji

Female cast

- Kumari Rukmani as Lavangi (Kameswari)
- B. Jayamma as Mumtaz
- Bhanumathi as Mahalakshmi
- K. R. Chellam as Komalam
- Jayagowri as Manorama

Dance

The Dance Group of Miss Azurie

Supporting cast

- V. S. Mani, Natesa Iyer, Sethupathi Pillai, Rajam Iyengar, Anantharaman, Rajarathnam, Jaya and Kalyani.

== Production ==
The film, which was shot at the famed Newton Studios, was recorded by noted photographer Jiten Bannerjee and designed by celebrated art director and film-maker F. Nagoor.

== Soundtrack ==
The music for the film was composed by Subbaraman and Padmanabha Shastri, with lyrics written by Papanasam Sivan. The songs were recorded by Dinshaw K. Tehrani and Loganathan. The film had melodious songs including a popular duet Vashakaarar Pola Thonuthey (performed by Rao and Rukmini).

No.	Song	Singers	Lyrics	Length (m:ss)
1	"Modi Seyvathu Niyayamo Thilaiyo Kanna"		Papanasam Sivan	
2	"Indra En Vaazhvil Inbanaal"	Kumari Rukmani	Papanasam Sivan	02:12
3	"Paavan Yamuna Theeram"	Y. V. Rao	Papanasam Sivan	
4	"Sukumara Unnaik Kannte Kanamoka Maiyal"	Jayagowri	Papanasam Sivan	
5	"Thuyaramo Erzhai Vaazhnaalellaam"	Kumari Rukmani	Papanasam Sivan	02:20
6	"Neel Kanjavizhik"	B. Jayamma	Papanasam Sivan	03:05
7	"Aa Aa Paaduvom Ellorum"	B. Jayamma	Papanasam Sivan	02:49
8	"Paaraamugam Eno Pethai En Parithapam"	Kumari Rukmani	Papanasam Sivan	03:17
9	"Aha Inre Peranantam"	Kumari Rukmani, B. Jayamma, Y. V. Rao	Papanasam Sivan	
10	"Vashakaakar Pola Thonuthe"	Kumari Rukmani, Y. V. Rao	Papanasam Sivan	
11	"Premaiya Uyirkal Innuyirame"	Kumari Rukmani, Y. V. Rao	Papanasam Sivan	

== Release and reception ==
Lavangi was released on 10 May 1946, and distributed by Chandralekha. The Indian Express positively reviewed the film for Rao's performance, but criticised some of Narayanan's dialogue for vulgarity. However, the film was not commercially successful. It was later dubbed into Hindi, which was not successful either.
