= Balijepalli Lakshmikantha Kavi =

Indian writer, actor and freedom fighter (1881–1953)

- Born: 23 December 1881; Bapatla, Andhra Pradesh, India
- Died: 30 June 1953 (aged 71); Sri Kalahasti, Andhra Pradesh, India
- Education: Matriculation
- Alma mater: Hindu College, Guntur
- Relatives: Balijepalli Seetaramayya
- Writing career
- Genres: Playwright, poet, actor
- Notable work: Satya Harischandriyamu

Balijepalli Lakshmikantha Kavi (23 December 1881 – 30 June 1953) was an Indian playwright, novelist, poet, screenwriter, actor and freedom fighter. He is remembered for the magnum opus Satya Harischandriyamu, a play written in 1924, and for his works in Telugu cinema.

== Brief life ==
He was born in Itikampadu village of Guntur district near Bapatla in 1881 to Narasimha Sastry and Adilakshmamma. After matriculation in Kurnool, he worked for some in the Sub-registrar office as Gumasta. He worked as teacher in Hindu College. He used to tour different Zamindaris to perform Avadhanams.

He established Chandrika Printing press in Guntur with the help of Challapalli Raja in 1922. He had participated in Salt Satyagraha and was jailed. While in prison, he wrote Satya Harischandriyam drama. He established First Drama Company in 1926 and played Satya Harischandra and Uttara Raghavam many times. He used to play critical roles in these plays. The most prominent role he used to play was Nakshatraka.

He entered the film industry with encouragement by Chittajallu Pullayya and wrote dialogues and songs and acted in some Telugu films. His debut film as an actor was Vara Vikrayam in 1939. He portrayed the character Lingaraju. He died in Sri Kalahasti in 1953.

== Literary works ==
Cover page of Satya Harischandriyamu play

- Sivanandalahari Satakam (Telugu translation of Adi Sankara's work; 1916)
- Swarajya Samasya (Poetic work)
- Brahmaratham (Novel)
- Mani Manjusha (Novel)
- Buddhimati Vilasamu (Play)
- Satya Harishchandriyamu (Play)
- Uttara Raghavamu (Telugu translation of Bhavabhuti's work)

== Filmography ==
- Anasuya (1936) (writer)
- Jarasandha (1938) (lyricist)
- Malli Pelli(1939) (dialogue writer and actor)
- Vara Vikrayam (1939) (dialogue writer and actor)
- Bhukailasa (1940) (dialogue)
- Viswa Mohini (1940) (dialogue)
- Jeevana Mukthi (1942)
- Bala Nagamma (1942) (writer and actor)
- Tahsildar (1944) (dialogue writer and actor)
- Brahma Ratham (1947) (writer)
- Raksharekha (1949) (dialogues, story writer and actor)
