= Amarapu Satyanarayana =

- Born: 12 April 1936; Pamulavalsa, Bobbili, Srikakulam, India
- Died: 20 October 2011 (aged 74)
- Occupation(s): Singer, actor

Amarapu Satyanarayana (12 April 1936 – 20 October 2011) was an Indian singer and actor.

== Early life ==
Satyanarayana was born at Pamulavalasa village in Therlam Mandalam in the Indian state of Andhra Pradesh. His parents were Appalanaidu and Kannamma. His teacher Sri Pakki Satyanarayana recognized his voice and talent and gave him an opportunity to perform. His teacher joined him at Sri Nomu Suryarao who was a great artist in dramas. He trained as an artist and in music.

== Career ==
He was said to be one of the best artists in India. He has given many performances. Some of his characters are linked to his life story. His main characters are Rama in the drama Ramanjaneya Yuddham, Krishna and Arjuna in the drama Gayopakhyanam, and Bilvamangal in the drama Chintamani. He performed with artists such as Kantha Rao, Dhulipala Seetharama Sastry, Allu Rama Lingaiah, Chandramohan and Rajanala.

He also worked as a Teacher (Social asst.) in the School at Rajam, Srikakulam district. He gave an interview to the news channel Gemini. He died 20 October 2011.

== Awards ==
- Gold medal in the Andhra parishat competitions in 1960
- Golden crown from Sri Rayana nataka parishad, Podduturu in 1965
- Raghave Award from Governor P. C. Alexander
