= Dusharla Satyanarayana =

Indian water rights activist

- Born: 1954 (age 71–72); Nalgonda, Hyderabad State, India
- Known for: Water activism

Dusharla Satyanarayana (born 12 March 1954) is an Indian water rights activist and founder of Jala Sadhana Samithi (JSS). He is fighting for drinking and irrigation water for Nalgonda district in Telangana, formerly Andhra Pradesh, India, by completing the decades-old Srisailam Left Bank Canal Tunnel scheme. He also supported statehood for Telangana. He is vice president of Suvidha.

== Early life ==
He was born in Raghavapuram village, Mothey Mandal, Nalgonda district, Telangana State. He did his B.Sc. (Agriculture) at Jayashanker Agricultural University, Hyderabad.

== Career ==
He joined Andhra Bank, Cuddapah in 1977 as an agricultural assistant. He resigned and worked as Rural Development Officer in the Union Bank of India. After looking at the plight of the small and marginal farmers he left to become an activist.

=== Jala Sadhana Samithi ===
He founded Jala Sadhana Samithi in 1980 to fight for the unjust treatment of water allocation to Nalgonda, which resulted in widespread cases of fluorosis. He did walkathons for water as well as Telangana statehood.

He did various types of protests like padayatras from Nalgonda to Srisailam, Yadagirigutta and Hyderabad to highlight the water woes of the people of the region in general and the fluoride victims of the district in particular. He did protests in Delhi.
