= K. Satyanarayana Raju =

Indian politician

Kantheti Satyanarayana Raju is an Indian politician and member of the Bharatiya Janata Party. Raju was a member of the Andhra Pradesh Legislative Council as a nominated member.
