= Banda Kanakalingeswara Rao =

Indian actor (1907–1968)

- Born: 20 January 1907; Kaikaluru, Krishna district, Andhra Pradesh
- Died: 3 December 1968 (aged 61)
- Occupation: Actor
- Awards: Sangeet Natak Akademi Award (1963)

Banda Kanakalingeswara Rao (20 January 1907 – 3 December 1968) was an Indian actor known for his works in Telugu theatre, and Telugu cinema. He was a member of Kendriya Sangeet Natak Akademi from 1952 and Andhra Pradesh Sangeet Natak Akademi from 1957.

He promoted Kuchipudi dance along with Vedantam Parvatisam in 1957 helped the government in the establishment of Siddhendra Kalakshetra in Kuchipudi village. This institution was later merged with the Potti Sreeramulu Telugu University in 1989. He wrote many articles to take this art form to the public. He joined All India Radio in 1956 and broadcast many drama and playlets. He founded Shiva temple and Vedic School in his native village.

He entered the Telugu film industry in its early period and acted in films including Paduka Pattabhishekham (1945), Bala Nagamma (1942), Sarangadhara (1937), and Draupadi Manasamrakshanam (1936).

== Early life ==
He was born in 1907 at Atapaka village in Kaikaluru mandal of Krishna district, Andhra Pradesh. He attended Noble College, Machilipatnam. He graduated from Madras Law College in 1932. He practiced as a lawyer before shifting to the theatre. He was well known for the Bahuka in Chitranaleeyam and Bilwamangal in Chintamani.

== Personal life ==
His wife died in 1942 and he returned to Eluru. He married again. He had seven daughters and a son.

== Death ==
He died in 1968. His statue was built in Atapaka village.

== Awards ==
- He was recipient of Sangeet Natak Akademi Award in 1963.

== Filmography ==
- Paduka Pattabhishekam (1945) ... Bharatha
- Bala Nagamma (1942) ... Kaaryavardhi Raju
- Sarangadhara (1937) ... Sarangadhara
- Draupadi Manasamrakshanam (1936)
