= Kallakuri Narayana Rao =

Indian play writer

Kallakuri Narayana Rao (28 April 1871 – 27 June 1927) was a social reformer, playwright and Indian nationalist. His honorific name is "Mahakavi".

== Works ==
Some of his plays were Varavikrayam, Chintamani, Madhuseva, Chitrabhyudayam and Padmavyuham(1919). His play chintamani depicted how Chintamani attained liberation through conscious devotion to Lord Krishna, although she was born into a family of professional harlots.

His play "Padmavyuham" (Army configuration of the Lotus) used historical and mythological frameworks as allegories for contemporary conditions under British domination.

His novel "Varavikrayam" is about the dowry system prevalent in British India. The film Varavikrayam is based on the novel and play of the same name.

His mythological verse plays are very popular. He penned these myth-dramas based on the Ramayana, Mahabharata, Bhagavata, Siva Puranam and other epics.
