= Pakkinti Ammayi (1981 film) =

1981 film directed by K. Vasu

- Poster
- Directed by: K. Vasu
- Written by: Satyanand (dialogues)
- Screenplay by: K. Vasu
- Story by: Arun Chowdhury
- Produced by: A. Sarathi; K. C. Sekhar Babu (presented by)
- Starring: Jayasudha; Chandra Mohan; Chakravarthy; S. P. Balasubrahmanyam
- Music by: Chakravarthi
- Production company: Nagarjuna Productions
- Release date: 27 November 1981
- Country: India
- Language: Telugu

Pakkinti Ammayi (transl. 'The girl next door') is a 1981 Indian Telugu-language comedy film directed by K. Vasu and produced by A. Sarathi. It is a remake of the 1953 Telugu film of the same name which itself is a remake of the Bengali-language film Pasher Bari (1952) based on the namesake short story by Arun Chowdhury. The film stars Jayasudha, Chandra Mohan, SP Balasubrahmanyam, and Chakravarthi in key roles. The music was composed by Chakravarthi who also played the role of a music teacher in the film. The movie released on 27 November 1981 and was not commercially successful.

== Plot ==
Buchi Babu (Chandra Mohan) stays next to the house of Indu (Jayasudha). She madly likes dance and music very much. She appoints a music teacher. She does not like the actions of Buchi Babu. But he likes her very much and even loves her. He takes the help of some friends and tries to impress her showing that he knows music very well. She involves her teacher against Buchi Babu. He takes the help of his friend Balaraju (S. P. Balasubrahmanyam) and acts as if he is the one singing songs, while Balaraju is singing from the background. As a result, Indu almost likes him. But after knowing that he is not the singer, she changes her mind. Buchi Babu acts suicidal for her refusal. Indu finally changes her mind and loves him.

== Cast ==
- Jayasudha as Indira "Indu"
- Chandra Mohan as Buchi Babu
- Chakravarthy as Siva Nataraja Bhagavatar
- S. P. Balasubrahmanyam as Bala Raju
- Mada as Buchi Babu's friend
- Hema Sundar as Indu's father
- Prabhakar Reddy as Buchi Babu's maternal uncle

== Music ==
The music of the film was composed by K. Chakravarthy. The lyrics were written by Arudra, Veturi, and Gopi.

- "Ragam Ragam" - P. Susheela
- "Indu Naa Kallaku Vindu" - S. P. Balasubrahmanyam
- "Idi Sangeeta Samaramu" - S. P. Balasubrahmanyam
- "Ivi Edabatula" - S. P. Balasubrahmanyam
- "Music Bit"
- "Pakkinti Ammayi" - S. P. Balasubrahmanyam
