= Press Academy of Andhra Pradesh =

C. Raghavachary Media Academy of Andhra Pradesh
- Formation: 1996
- Type: State-run media training institution
- Headquarters: Revenue Colony, Mogalrajpuram, Vijayawada, Andhra Pradesh, India
- Chairman: Alapati Suresh Kumar (since 2025)
- Formerly called: Press Academy of Andhra Pradesh

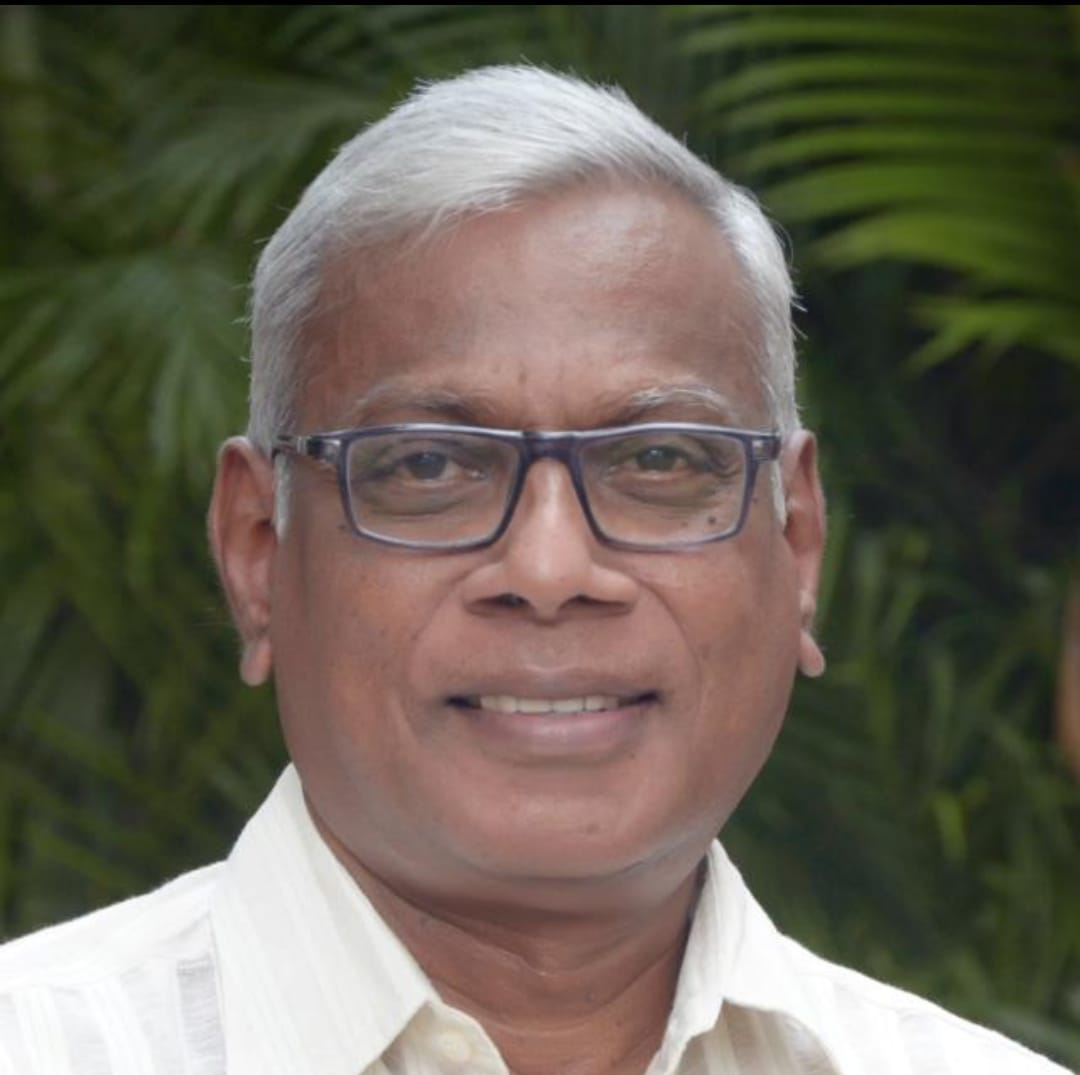
Alapati Suresh, Chairman of C. Raghavachary Media Academy of Andhra Pradesh since June 2025

The C. Raghavachary Media Academy of Andhra Pradesh (formerly the Press Academy of Andhra Pradesh) is a governmental institution to co-ordinate study and research in journalism, in Vijayawada, Andhra Pradesh, India. Founded in 1996, the Academy focuses on the professional development of journalists and ethical standards in print, broadcast, and digital media. By 2005, the academy had digitalised 16-lakh pages of newspapers, magazines, and periodicals published from pre-independence to post-independence, up to 1977. K.Srinivasa Reddy was the first chairman of the academy, and it has been chaired by journalist Alapati Suresh Kumar since June 2025.

== History ==
The Academy was established in 1996 by the Government of Andhra Pradesh under Chief Minister N. Chandrababu Naidu to improve journalistic standards in the state. After the bifurcation of Andhra Pradesh in 2014, the Academy continued to function in the residual state.

In 2020, it was renamed the C. Raghavachary Press Academy of Andhra Pradesh in honour of veteran journalist C. Raghavachary. In 2023, the word Press was replaced with Media to reflect the rise of television and digital journalism alongside print.

== Location ==
The Academy's headquarters are in Revenue Colony, Mogalrajpuram, Vijayawada, Andhra Pradesh.

== Objectives ==
The Academy’s main objectives include:

- Enhancing the professional and technical skills of journalists, particularly in rural and semi-urban areas.
- Promoting value-based and ethical journalism.
- Organising workshops, diploma courses, and training programmes.
- Collaborating with universities to strengthen academic qualifications of journalists.
- Instituting awards and cash prizes to encourage quality reporting, particularly in rural journalism.
- Discussing the responsible use of social media in news dissemination (without regulatory powers).

== Training and Academic Programmes ==
- Diploma in Journalism – Introduced in 2023 in collaboration with Acharya Nagarjuna University (ANU, Guntur). The diploma is offered online and through correspondence for working journalists.
- University collaborations – MoUs with Vikrama Simhapuri University and Sri Padmavati Mahila Visvavidyalayam provide up to 50% subsidy in course fees for journalists pursuing media studies.

== Awards and recognition ==
The Academy organises awards and events to recognise journalists, including:

- Awards for excellence in rural journalism.
- Special recognition for women journalists, particularly on International Women’s Day.
- Co-organisation of national-level events such as the APPJA National Photography Contest.

== Leadership ==
Chairpersons since 2014:

- Devireddy Sreenath Reddy (2019)
- Kommineni Srinivasa Rao (2022)
- Alapati Suresh Kumar (since 2025)
