= Malli Pelli (1939 film) =

1939 film by Y. V. Rao

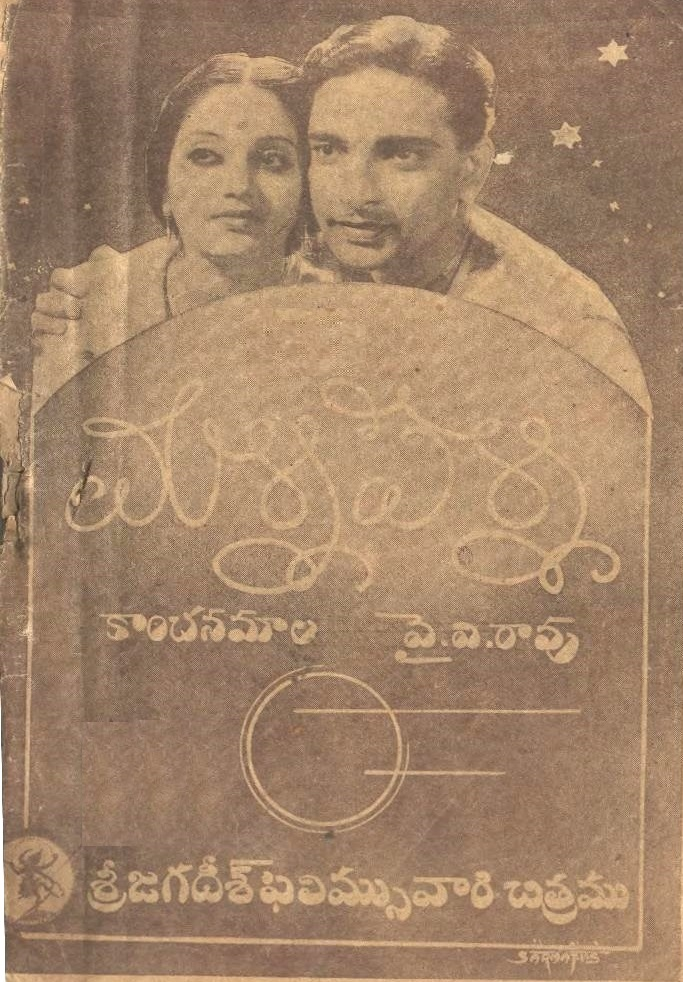
- Poster of Malli Pelli
- Directed by: Y. V. Rao
- Written by: Kavitha Kalanidhi; Balijepalli Lakshmikantham Kavi (Dialogues)
- Produced by: Y. V. Rao
- Starring: Y. V. Rao; Kanchanamala; Balijepalli Lakshmikantham Kavi
- Cinematography: Jiten Banerji
- Music by: V. Ramachandra Rao
- Production companies: Sri Jagadish Films; Newton Studios
- Release date: 1939
- Running time: 187 minutes
- Country: India
- Language: Telugu

Malli Pelli is a 1939 Indian Telugu-language social drama film directed by Y. V. Rao. The film swayed the imagination of the social reformers of the day, such as Ram Mohan Roy and Kandukuri Veeresalingam.

== Plot ==
Janardhana Rao Panthulu (Balijepalli) is a lawyer. He was a fundamentalist who valued commitments to orthodox rituals. He marries his six-year-old daughter Lalita (Kanchanamala) to an old man and dies shortly after. The result is that Lalita becomes a widow at an early age. Elegant grows between serious commitments.

A Swami named Kaliyuganandaswamy enters the house and Janardhana Rao enters the house. The name of the master was spread all over the place. All the people flocked to see him, believing that it was heaven to eat their Tirthaprasadas. The masters make Janarthana Rao a puppet in his hand and wield power over him.

One day someone came to call me by name and unknowingly put a blob on Lalit's face. The blob masters look on and shout that the Kallerra Jesse religion has been desecrated. All the salesmen speak Nana. Lalit is in desperate grief.

She is introduced to a social reformer named Sundara Rao (Y. V. Rao). He persuades her and frees her from the old commitments and remarries.

== Cast ==
- Y. V. Rao as Social reformer Sundara Rao
- Kanchanamala as Lalitha
- Balijepalli Lakshmikantham Kavi as Janardhana Rao Panthulu
- Bejawada Rajaratnam as Kamala
- Koccharlakota Satyanarayana as Venkata Rao
- Krishnaveni as Annapoorna
- Rangaswamy as Kaliyugananda Swamy
- Natesayya as Aparala Ananthayya
- Manikyamma as Venkamma
- Narayanayya as CID Inspector
- Rajalakshmamma as Subbamma
- Srinivas as Ramajogi
- Suryanarayana as Sapindi Sankarayya
- Kasi Chenchu as Sabhapati
- Ramachandra Murthy as Ramudu
- Rajaratnam as Kamala/Subhadramma
- Krishnavenamma as Annapurnamma
- Naga Lakshmi as Naamcharamma

== Music ==
The soundtrack of the film is composed by V. Ramachandra Rao and lyrics were written by Balijepalli Lakshmikantham Kavi. The following are the songs in the film:

- "Aanadamega Vaanchhaneeyamu"
- "Cheli Kumkumame Paavaname"
- "Koyilaro Edi Ni Prema Geethi"
- "Na Sundara Surachira Rupa"
- "Gopalude Ma Gopalude"
