= Satyanarayan Singh =

Satyanarayan Singh (also written as Satya Narain Singh) may refer to:

- Satyanarayan Singh (U.P. politician) (born 1913), represented the Communist Party of India (Marxist) in the Lok Sabha
- Satyanarayan Singh (Bihar politician, died 1984), general secretary of the Provisional Central Committee, Communist Party of India (Marxist-Leninist)
- Satyanarayan Singh (Bihar politician, died 2020), Bihar State Council Secretary of the Communist Party of India
- Satyanarayan Singh (Bihar politician, Dehri), represents the Bharatiya Janata Party in the Bihar Legislative Assembly
