= Hindu College, Guntur =

Coordinates: 16.2966°N 80.4425°E

Hindu College (Guntur)
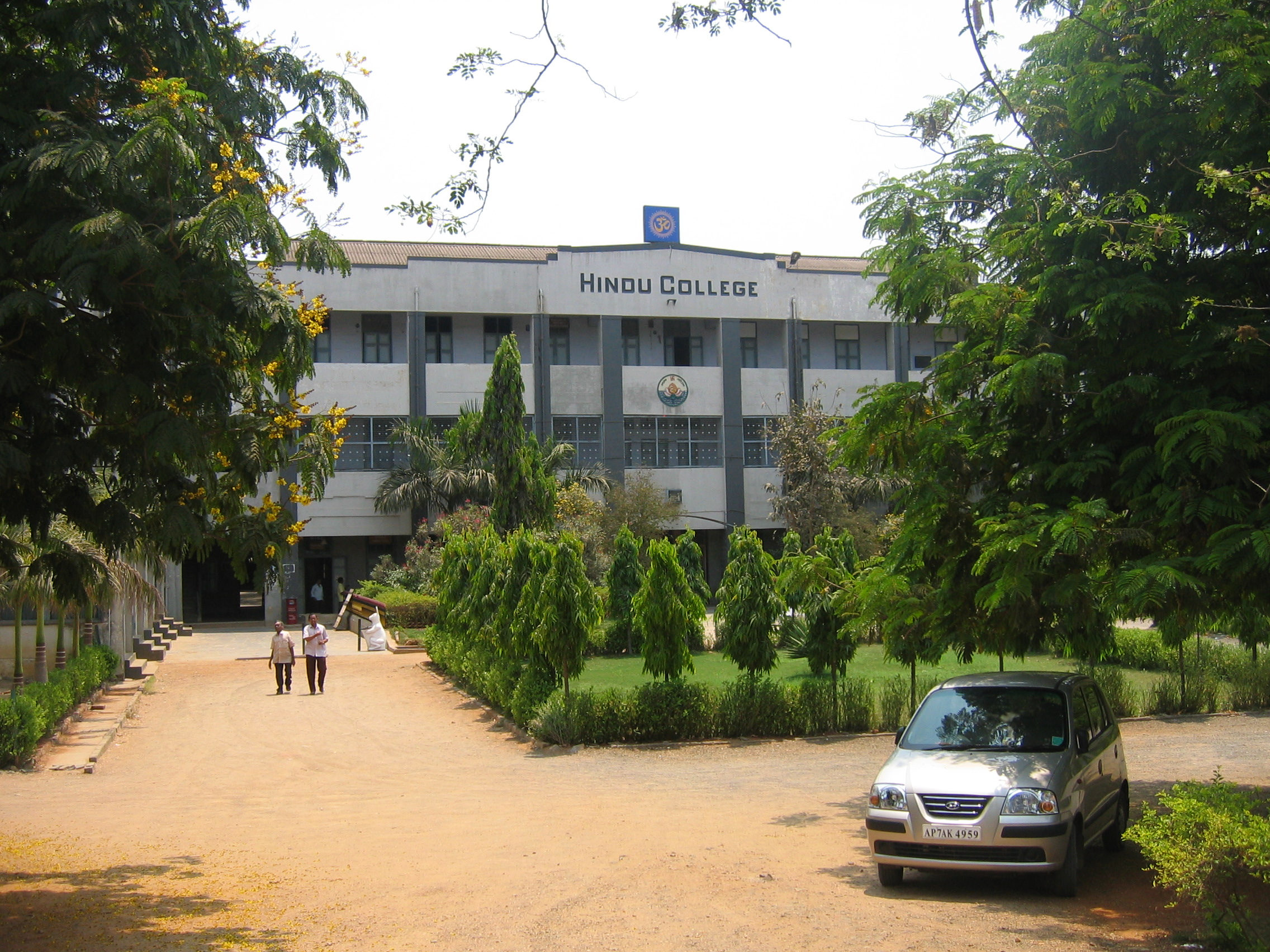
- Type: College
- Established: 1930
- Location: Guntur City, AP, India
- Campus: City, Suburban

Hindu College (Guntur) was founded in 1930. It is located in Guntur City, India.

== Introduction ==
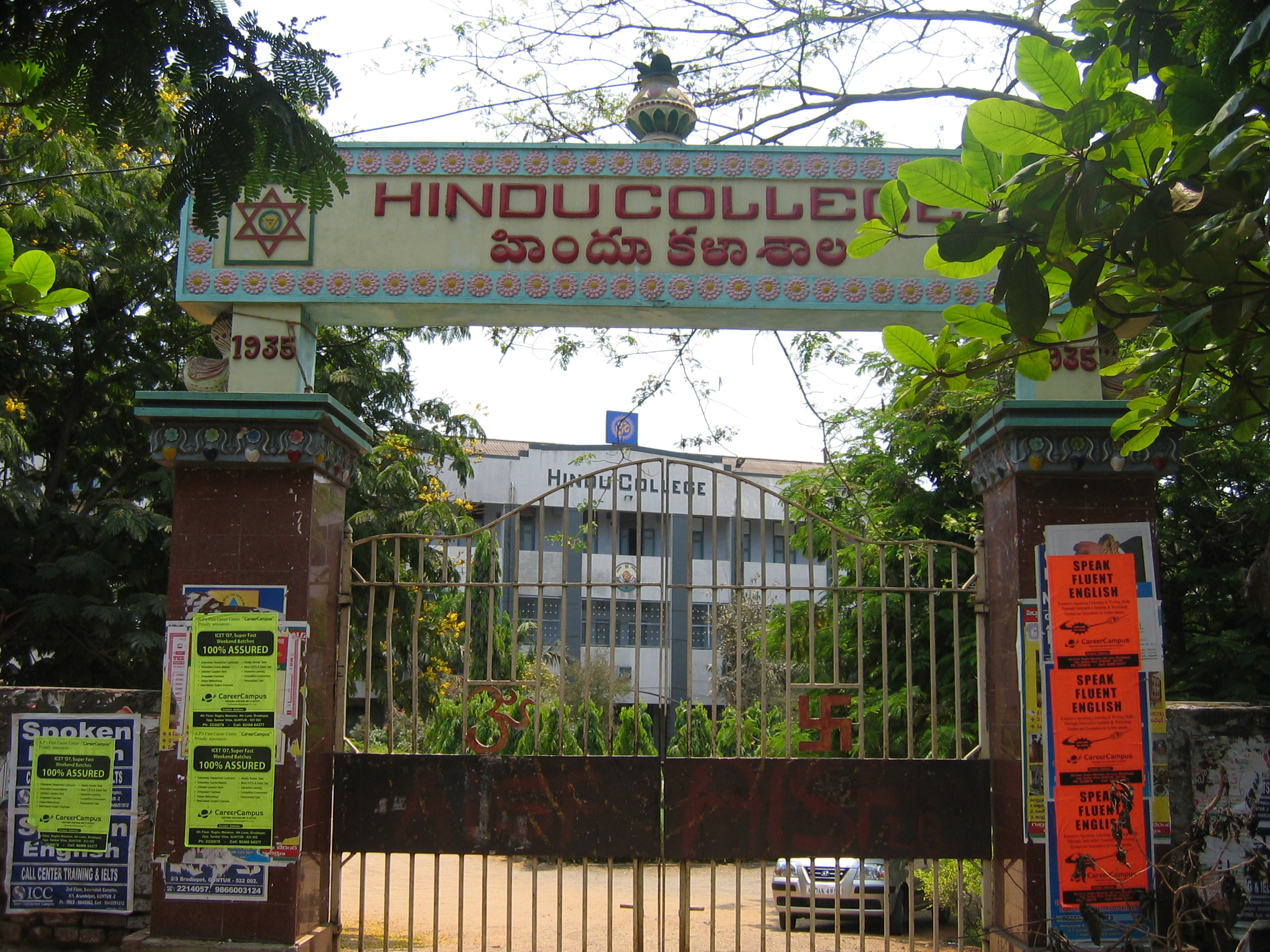
Main campus

This educational institution started its activities in 1930, around the same time the current Hindu high school started. Later it started offering other courses as well. It offers graduate and under-graduate courses. It has a Pharma College campus and a P.G. college on the Amaravathi Road which are recognized by the Acharya Nagarjuna University, Guntur.

Main Campus

== History ==
The main city campus was established in 1930. Later the campus for the College of Pharmacy was started in the suburban area of the city. This is one of the oldest colleges in A.P. Hindu college has P.G. courses separately in Amaravathi Road which is 3 km from the main campus. The Hindu College was founded in 1930 with Sri Kompalli Kotilingam as the founding president and Sri Aka Lakshmi Narasimham as the founding secretary, both leading lawyers of that time in the city. Sri Aka Lakshmi Narasimham took the idea of setting up a higher educational institute onto his shoulders for people of Hindu community upon the advice of his classmate and close friend, the ex-president of India, Sri Sarvepalli Radhakrishna. Later eminent persons of the Guntur city joined this campaign and established the institution.

== Departments ==
- Courses: Masters and Bachelors in Arts, Science, Mathematics, Management, Pharmaceuticals, Electronics.
- Separate department for National Cadet Corps) 25(A) Battalion and 2 (Armed).
- The Fine Arts department allows the student to participate in cultural activities, essay writing and drawing. The college participates in inter college competitions in Nagarjuna University and got a best college prize in 2003.
- B.Sc Computer Science is the main course degree of the college.

Sister Institutions:

Hindu College of Pharmacy B.H.H. Junior college for Girls B.H.H. Degree College for women Hindu College High School Pattabhipuram High School Sri Majety Guravaiah High School Sri Majety Guravaiah Junior College Sri Majety Guravaiah Degree College

Infrastructural facilities in the College

- Main campus: about 115,000 square feet of built area, and open land of approximately 7.5 acres
- P.G. Campus: about 60,000 square feet of built area, and open land of approximately 8 acres
- Vacant Land for further development, of about 20.00 acres
- Auditorium: Sri Aka Danadaiah Pantulu Hall
- Seminar Hall
- Agricultural Farm
- Andhra Bank - Campus Branch
- Canteen
- Health Center With regular O.P. facility
- Facility for Indoor games and Gymnasium
- Acharya Nagarjuna University Distance Education Centre for U.G. and P.G.
- Central Library
- Computer Center
- Sports facility

The college also maintains a museum of geology in the Department of Geological Sciences.
