= Pasher Bari =

- Directed by: Sudhir Mukherjee
- Based on: Pasher Bari by Arun Chowdhury
- Starring: Sabitri Chatterjee; Bhanu Banerjee; Anup Kumar
- Music by: Salil Chowdhury
- Production company: Production Syndicate
- Release date: 7 March 1952
- Country: India
- Language: Bengali

Pasher Bari (transl. The House Next Door) is a 1952 Indian Bengali-language romantic comedy film directed by Sudhir Mukherjee based on the short story of the same name by Arun Chowdhury. This film was released on 7 March 1952 under the banner of Production Syndicate. The film was a major success at the box office, catapulting Sabitri Chatterjee to stardom. Several Indian films were made adapting the same story including the Telugu films Pakka Inti Ammayi (1953) and Pakkinti Ammayi (1981), the Tamil film Adutha Veettu Penn (1960), the Hindi film Padosan (1968), and the Kannada film Pakkadmane Hudugi (2004).

== Plot ==
This is a love story of a simple man who falls in love with his neighborhood lady. The lady has ample interest in songs and dances. The man without having singing ability wants to impress her but fails. He takes the help of his friend, a good singer.

== Cast ==
- Bhanu Banerjee
- Satya Bandyopadhyay
- Sabitri Chatterjee
- Dhananjay Bhattacharya
- Anup Kumar
