= C. Pullayya =

Film director

- చిత్తజల్లు పుల్లయ్య
- Born: Chittajallu Pullayya; 1 January 1898; Kakinada, India
- Died: 6 October 1967 (aged 69); Madras, India
- Occupations: Director, producer

Chittajallu Pullayya (1 January 1898 – 6 October 1967) was an Indian film director and screenwriter. He was among some of the earliest film personalities in Telugu cinema, being associated with the industry right from the silent era.

Pullayya started his film career in 1921 as a camera apprentice to the 'father of Telugu cinema' Raghupati Venkaiah Naidu’s production company Star of the East Films, in Madras, and at Kohinoor in Bombay. He was also a playwright for Kakinada-based Young Men’s Happy Club.

After gaining experience in filmmaking, he purchased a second-hand movie camera in 1924 in Bombay and returned to his native place Kakinada with an intention to make films in Andhra. He made a silent three-reel short film Markandeya (1926 or 1931) in Kakinada. To exhibit it he started a tent theatre named 'City Electric Cinema' and took the projector and chairs to various towns and exhibited the film, thus pioneering a movie theatre movement in Andhra. He later ran the permanent Minerva theatre.

In 1933, he made his first feature film Sati Savitri in Calcutta. It was the first Telugu film produced by East India Film Company and received an honorary diploma at the 2nd Venice Film Festival. He then directed Lava Kusa (1934) and Sati Anasuya (1936), the first Telugu children's film made with sixty child actors. Lava Kusa was the first major commercial success in Telugu cinema. The film attracted unprecedented numbers of viewers to theatres and thrust the young industry into mainstream culture.

He continued to direct films like Vara Vikrayam (1939), Maalati Madhavam (1940), Pakka Inti Ammayi (1953) under the East India Film Company. He directed Bala Nagamma (1942) and Apoorva Sahodarulu (1950) under Gemini Pictures after shifting base to Madras. He is well remembered for Lava Kusa (1963), the story of Lava and Kusa in Hindu epic Ramayana, which won the National Film Award for Best Feature Film in Telugu.

Pullayya introduced Bhanumathi and Anjali Devi to the film industry through Vara Vikrayam (1939) and Gollabhama (1947) respectively.

== Filmography ==
1. Ramadasu (1933)
2. Sati Savitri (1933)
3. Lava Kusa (1934)
4. Anasuya (1936)
5. Dhruva Vijayam (1936)
6. Chal Mohana Ranga (1937)
7. Dasavataramulu (1937)
8. Kasula Peru (1937)
9. Mohini Bhasmasura (1938)
10. Satyanarayana Vratam (1938)
11. Vara Vikrayam (1939)
12. Malathi Madhavam (1940)
13. Bala Nagamma (1942)
14. Narada Naradi (1946)
15. Gollabhama (1947)
16. Vindhyarani (1948)
17. Apoorva Sahodaralu (1950)
18. Sankranti (1952)
19. Pakka Inti Ammayi (1953)
20. Devanthakudu (1960)
21. Naan Kanda Sorgam (1960)
22. Lava Kusa (1963)
23. Paramanandayya Sishyula Katha (1966)
24. Bhuvana Sundari Katha (1967)
25. Bhama Vijayam (1967)
