= Pakka Inti Ammayi =

1953 film by C. Pullayya

- Poster
- Directed by: C. Pullayya
- Written by: Muddu Krishna (dialogues)
- Screenplay by: Arudra and C. S. Rao
- Story by: Arun Choudhary
- Produced by: Sushil Kumar Havaldar
- Starring: Anjali Devi; Relangi; A. M. Rajah; Addala Narayana Rao; C. S. Rao
- Cinematography: Biren De
- Music by: Aswathama
- Production company: East India Film Company
- Release date: 1953
- Running time: 164 minutes
- Country: India
- Language: Telugu

Pakka Inti Ammayi (transl. 'The girl next door') is a 1953 Indian Telugu-language romantic comedy film directed by C. Pullayya. The film featured Anjali Devi as the beautiful titular girl next door. Famous comedian Relangi acted as her lover Subbarayudu and veteran South Indian singer A. M. Rajah as his friend. It was produced by East Indian Company.

It is a remake of the Bengali film Pasher Bari (1952), itself based on the namesake short story by Arun Chowdhury. The film was remade in Telugu with the same name in 1981 by K. Vasu.

== Plot ==
Subbarayudu (Relangi) stays next to the house of Heroine Leela Devi (Anjali Devi). She madly likes dance and music. She appoints a music teacher Prem Kumar (Narayana Rao). She does not like the actions of Subbarayudu, but he likes her very much and even loves her. He takes the help of some friends and impresses her that he knows music very well. She involves her teacher Prem Kumar against Subbarayudu. He takes the help of his friend (A. M. Rajah) and mimes as if singing good songs, while Rajah is singing from the background. As a result, the heroine almost likes him. But after knowing that he is not the singer, she changes her mind. Subbarayudu acts suicidal because of her refusal. The heroine finally changes her mind and loves him.

== Cast ==
- Relangi as Subbarayudu
- Anjali Devi as Leela Devi
- Addala Narayana Rao as Prem Kumar
- A. M. Rajah as Raja
- Kamaladevi
- Mohana Krishna
- Gangaratnam
- Shakuntala
- C. S. Rao as Gas Lodge leader
- V. V. Tatachari as friend of Subbarayudu
- R. K. Rao as friend of Subbarayudu

== Songs ==
- "Kalayemo Idi Naa Jeevita Phalamemo" (Singer: A. M. Rajah)
- "Pasi Papa Mana" - P. Susheela
- "Ae Teeruna Galamu" - P. Susheela
- "Ee Geetika Galamunu" - P. Susheela
- "O Gulabi Puvvu" - P. Susheela
- "Vasantha Kalam" - P. Susheela
- "Nannalarinchuta Nyayamera" - P. Susheela
