= Lava (Ramayana) =

Son of Rama and Sita

- King of Uttara Kosala and Lavapuri
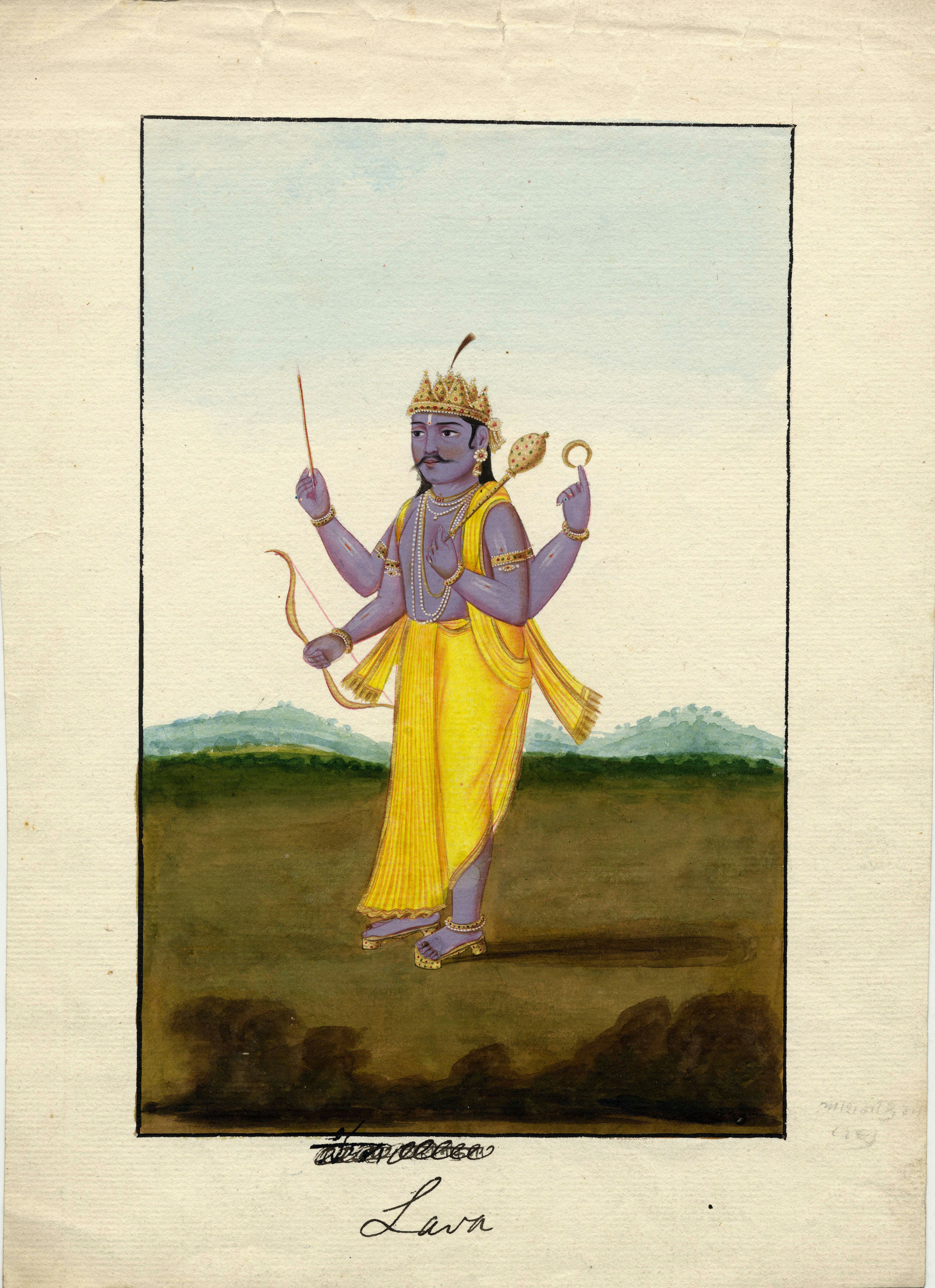
- Lava, one of twin sons of Rama and Sita
- Predecessor: Rama
- Successor: Atithi
- Spouse: Sumati and Kanjanana (according to Ananda Ramayana)
- Dynasty: Raghuvamsha-Suryavamsha
- Father: Rama
- Mother: Sita

Lava (Sanskrit: लव, IAST: Lava) is the younger of the twin sons of Rama and Sita in the Hindu epic Ramayana. His elder twin brother is Kusha.

According to tradition, the Ramayana was first recited to Lava and Kusha by its composer, Valmiki, and the brothers popularised the epic by traveling and reciting it. Following the death of Rama, Lava succeeded him to rule the northern region of Kosala, establishing his capital at Shravasti.

== Legend ==
The first chapter of Ramayana, the Bala Kanda, mention Valmiki narrating the Ramayana to his disciples, Lava and Kusha.

=== Birth ===
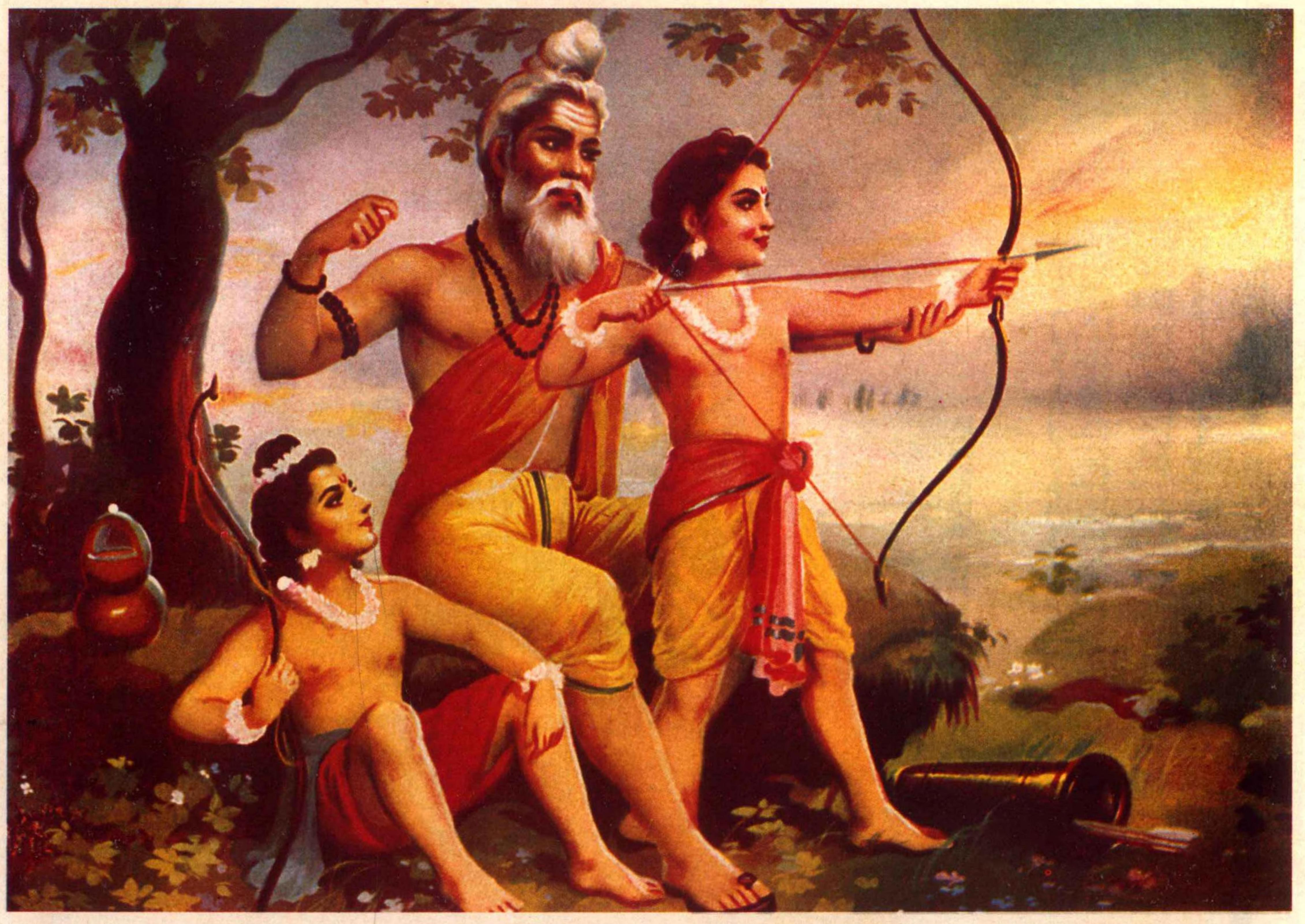
Valmiki trains Lava and Kusha in archery

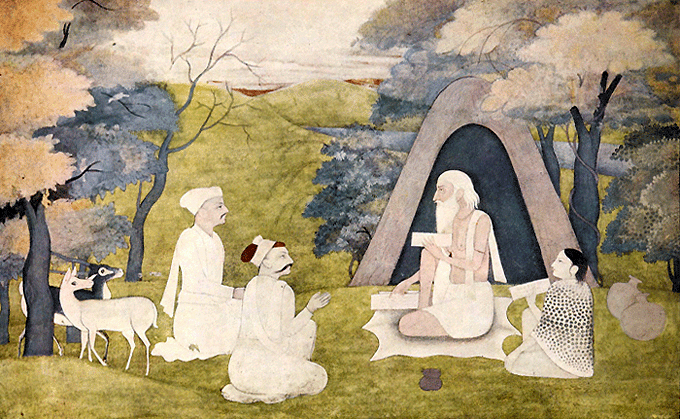
Valmiki recites the Ramayana to Kusha and Lava

In the Uttara Kanda, Rama instructs his brother Lakshmana to leave behind a pregnant Sita at the hermitage of the sage Valmiki, due to public condemnation of his keeping her as his queen despite her captivity by Ravana at Lanka. Sita gave birth to twin sons, Kusha and Lava, at the ashram, where they were educated and trained in military skills under the tutelage of the sage.

=== Ashvamedha Yajna ===
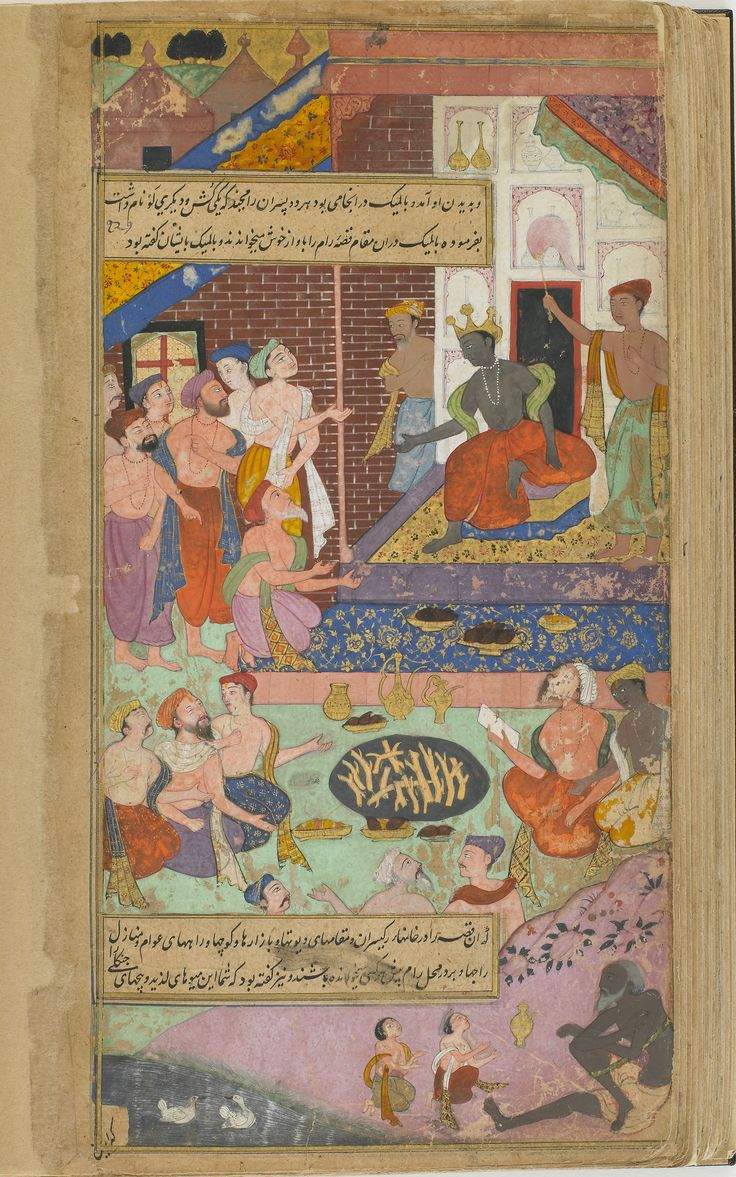
Valmiki instructs Kusha and Lava to recite the Ramayana before the occasion of a sacrifice in Rama's pavilion

Sage Valmiki, along with Lava and Kusha and a disguised Sita, attend an ashvamedha yajna held by Rama.

Valmiki commands Lava and Kusha to chant the Ramayana in the presence of Rama and a vast audience in the sacrificial pavilion. Their resemblance to Rama is noted by the ascetics. The twins refuse a reward of gold pieces for their recitation, declaring grain and fruits to suffice for them in the forest. Recognising his sons, Rama orders them and Sita to appear before him in the assembly, seeking reconciliation. During this occasion, he formally acknowledges the twins to be his sons. He anoints them his heirs before his death.

In some versions of the epic and the Padma Purana, Lava and Kusha capture the horse of the sacrifice and defeat Rama's brothers and their army. Sita intervenes and unites the father and sons.

=== Marriage and reign ===
On attaining adulthood Lava was made the king of Uttar Koshala kingdom, and he ruled from Shravasti. Lava and his twin brother Kusha married the Trigarta King Bhurikirti's twin daughters princess Sumati and princess Champika, respectively. Later Lava also took the Naga princess Kanjanana as his second wife.

=== Ananda Ramayana ===
In the Ananda Ramayana, Lava is described to have a wife named Sumati, and together the couple ruled the city of Lavapuri and the kingdom of Shravasti.

== In popular culture ==
Lava is purported to have founded Lavapuri (the modern day city of Lahore), which is named after him.

There is a Hindu temple associated with Lava (or Loh) inside Shahi Qila, Lahore.
