= Pedda Manushulu (1954 film) =

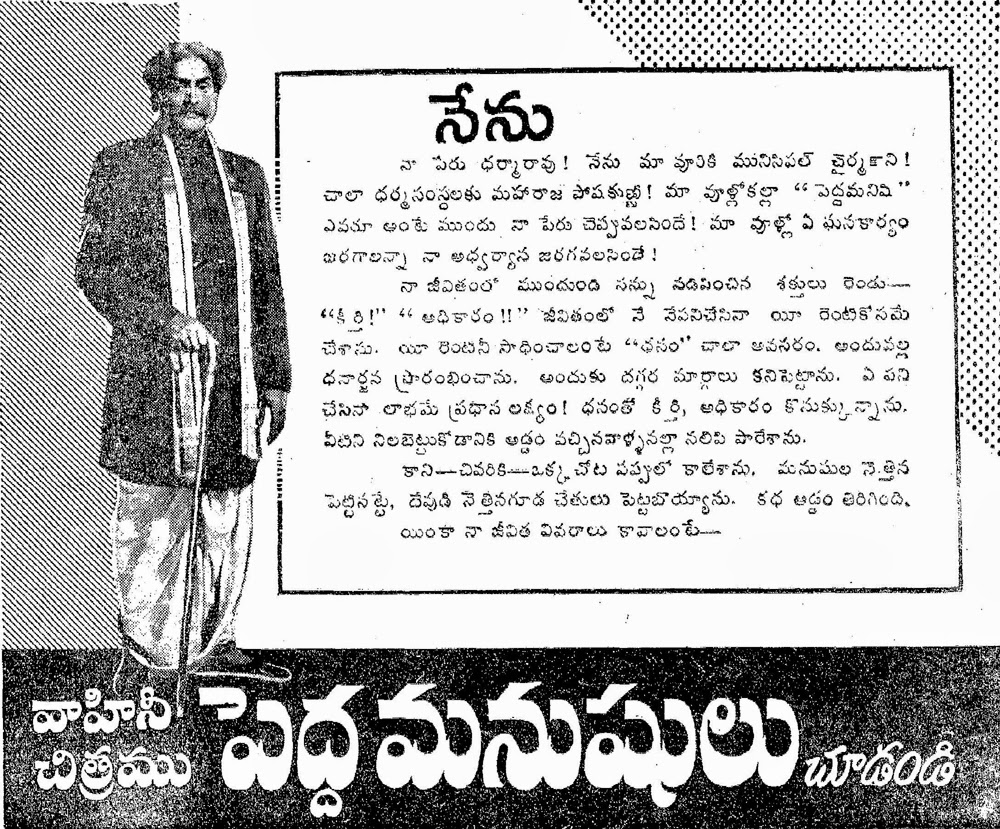
- Poster
- Directed by: K. V. Reddy
- Written by: K. V. Reddy; D. V. Narasa Raju; D. B. G. Tilak
- Produced by: K. V. Reddy
- Starring: Jandhyala Gaurinatha Sastri; Mudigonda Lingamurthy; Relangi; Sriranjani Jr. Chadalavada; Vangara; A.V.Subba Rao; Ramachandra Kasyapa
- Cinematography: B. N. Konda Reddy
- Edited by: M. S. Mani
- Music by: Ogirala Ramchandra Rao; Addepalli Rama Rao
- Production company: Vauhini Studios
- Release date: March 11, 1954
- Running time: 191 minutes
- Country: India
- Language: Telugu

Pedda Manushulu (transl. Gentlemen or transl. Respectable People) is a 1954 Indian Telugu-language drama film produced and directed by K. V. Reddy. It stars Jandhyala Gaurinatha Sastry, Mudigonda Lingamurthy, Relangi, Vangara, and Sriranjani Jr. in prominent roles. The film portrays corruption among so-called respectable persons of the society. It was loosely based on The Pillars of Society, a 1877 play by famous Norwegian playwright Henrik Ibsen.

Pedda Manushulu was commercially successful. It was the first Telugu film to win the National Film Award. The film demonstrated K. V. Reddy's ability in directing not only fantasy and mythological films, but also social dramas. The film became a trendsetter for many later films with a similar theme. It showed that those who are considered Pedda Manushulu by the society may be corrupt. After the film's release, the term Pedda Manushulu had negative connotations in Telugu culture for a long time.

== Cast ==
- Jandhyala Gaurinatha Sastry as Dharma Rao
- Mudigonda Lingamurthy as Ramadasu
- Relangi as 'Tikka' Sankarayya
- Vangara as Siddhanti
- Chadalavada as Avataram
- A. V. Subbarao as Nagoji
- Ramachandra Kasyapa as Prabhakar
- Sriranjani Jr. as Padma
- C. Hemalatha as Seetamma
- Seshamamba as Ganga Bai
- Rama Rao Venkata Vajjhala

== Production ==
=== Development ===
After the success of Pathala Bhairavi, Nagi Reddi asked K. V. Reddy to make another fantasy film for Vijaya Productions. But, after directing two historical films (Bhakta Pothana, Yogi Vemana) and two fantasy films (Gunasundari Katha, Pathala Bhairavi ), K. V. Reddy wanted to make a drama film this time. As B. N. Reddy and K. V. Reddy previously agreed to alternately direct films for Vauhini, K. V. Reddy planned to make his next film on Vauhini Productions banner.

K. V. Reddy was interested in western literature and films. The Pillars of Society, a 1877 play by famous Norwegian playwright Henrik Ibsen attracted him. He wanted to direct a film based on the play. He collaborated with D. V. Narasaraju and D. B. G. Tilak and prepared the script. Only two characters from the play were retained and rest of the story was newly developed by the writers.

=== Casting ===
Narasaraju felt that the role of Dharma Rao was tailor-made for V. Nagayya, but he and K. V. Reddy had an ego hassle regarding the dates of Yogi Vemana (1947), so Jandhyala Gowrinatha Sastry was cast in that role. He had earlier done a minor role as Sreenadha in K. V. Reddy's Bhakta Potana (1943). Relangi, who was famous for his comic roles, was cast as 'Tikka Sankarayya' in a serious role. Ramachandra Kasyapa, junior to Narasaraju in college was cast for the role of Prabhakar.

Kosaraju Raghavayya wrote lyrics for three songs in the film. Kosaraju had a smashing debut with Raithu Bidda (1939) and procured the title 'Kavi Ratna', after which he went back to a quiet life as a farmer. Narasaraju wished him to come back and write, to which Kosaraju was hesitant. He finally wrote the extremely difficult satirical numbers in flat one week and went back to his home.

== Music ==
Music was composed by Ogirala Ramchandra Rao and Addepalli Rama Rao. The film featured a total of nine songs. Lyrics were penned by Vutukuri Satyanarayana Rao, Kosaraju and N. Raghava Rao. While Ghantasala, P. Leela, Jikki, Pithapuram Nageswara Rao, Madhavapeddi Satyam and Varma were the playback singers.

- "Nandamaya Guruda Nandamaya Ananda Deviki Nandamaya" (Singer: Ghantasala)
- "Siva Siva Moortivi Gananatha" (Singer: Ghantasala)

== Awards ==
National Film Awards

- 2nd National Film Awards (1954) - National Film Award for Best Feature Film in Telugu
