= K. V. Reddy =

Indian film director, screenwriter, and producer (1912–1972)

- Born: Kadiri Venkata Reddy; 1 July 1912; Tellamitta Palle, near Tadipatri, Anantapuram district, British India (now Andhra Pradesh, India)
- Died: 15 September 1972 (aged 60); Chennai, Tamil Nadu, India
- Occupations: Director, Producer, Writer
- Years active: 1940–1970
- Spouse: Seshamma (m.1932)

Kadiri Venkata Reddy (1 July 1912 – 15 September 1972), commonly known as K. V. Reddy, was an Indian film director, screenwriter, and producer, primarily known for his work in Telugu cinema. Renowned as one of the most influential filmmakers in South Indian cinema, he directed 14 feature films during his career. His contributions earned him several prestigious accolades, including three National Film Awards and a Filmfare Award South.

His filmography includes films based on itihasa-puranas like Mayabazar (1957), Sri Krishnarjuna Yuddhamu (1962), Sri Krishna Satya (1972); fantasy films like Gunasundari Katha (1949), Pathala Bhairavi (1951), Jagadeka Veeruni Katha (1961); historical biopics like Bhakta Potana (1942), Yogi Vemana (1947), and drama films like Pedda Manushulu (1954), Donga Ramudu (1955), Pellinaati Pramanalu (1959).

Pathala Bhairavi was the only South Indian film to be screened at the first International Film Festival of India in 1952. Donga Ramudu was archived in the curriculum of the Film and Television Institute of India. Mayabazar is widely regarded as one of the greatest Indian films ever produced. On the centenary of Indian cinema in April 2013, CNN-IBN included Pathala Bhairavi and Mayabazar in its list of "100 greatest Indian films of all time". In an online poll featuring the films in the list, Mayabazar was voted by the public as the "greatest Indian film of all time."

== Early life ==
Kadiri Venkata Reddy was born on 1 July 1912 in a Telugu family in Tellamitta Palle near Tadipatri in Anantapur district in present-day Andhra Pradesh. His parents were Konda Reddy and Venkata Rangamma. His mother was a devotee of Venkateswara. His father died when K. V. Reddy was two years old. Later, he and his mother moved to his maternal uncle's home.

He performed well in academics and actively took part in sports like football and hockey. He was good at mathematics and painting. Actor Moola Narayana Swamy was a close friend of Reddy's from his school days.

He completed his B.Sc degree in Physics from Madras Presidency College. While living in Madras, he was fascinated with the cinema industry which was still in its nascent stage. He started regularly watching films and would watch three films on Sundays. P. Pullayya was one year senior to him in college. P. Pullayya entered the film industry while K. V. Reddy was still in college. Both of them would frequently discuss about stories suitable to be made as films.

K. V. Reddy graduated in 1935. He wanted to enter the film industry after the completion of his graduation. He started reading various books on filmmaking. He studied and analysed films and books by Russian and Japanese filmmakers.

== Career ==
After graduation, K. V. Reddy started a business named "The Standard Scientific Instruments Company" with his friend A. V. V. Krishna Rao. Started with an initial capital of ₹250, the company manufactured scientific instruments that are used in schools and colleges. He ran the business for one year during 1936–37 and it was successful.

=== 1937–1941: Early career ===
K. V. Reddy was invited by his childhood friend Moola Narayana Swamy to work in the production department of a film he was co-producing. K. V. Reddy joined as a cashier for Rohini Pictures in 1937 for the film Gruhalakshmi. The film released in 1938 and was commercially successful.

Rohini Pictures was formed by the partnership of H. M. Reddy along with B. N. Reddy and Moola Narayana Swamy. The latter two had differences with H. M. Reddy and split themselves from Rohini Pictures and established Vauhini Pictures. Narayana Swamy was the Chairman and B. N. Reddy was the Managing Director of the company. K. V. Reddy joined Vauhini Pictures along with them. He was also made a partner in the company. He worked as a Production Manager for Vauhini films like Vande Mataram (1939), Sumangali (1940), Devatha (1941). While working as a cashier and a production manager, K. V. Reddy developed understanding of various aspects of filmmaking. While working at Vauhini Pictures, he became acquainted with Kamalakara Kameswara Rao, who was an assistant to B. N. Reddy. They made a pact that the first one to become a director among them would work as an assistant to the other.

=== 1942–1950: Directorial debut and breakthrough ===
==== Bhakta Pothana (1943) ====
While working as a production manager at Vauhini, K. V. Reddy prepared the script for a film based on the life of 15th century Telugu poet Pothana. Though it was opposed by various people in the company for K. V. Reddy's lack of directorial experience, Narayana Swamy greenlit the project. The film was titled Bhakta Pothana and featured V. Nagayya in the title role. Kamalakara Kameswara Rao assisted him as was previously agreed upon. The production of the film was interrupted by the second world war. But Bhakta Pothana completed its production and was finally released on 7 January 1943. The film was successful all over South India including Mysore state and Kerala.

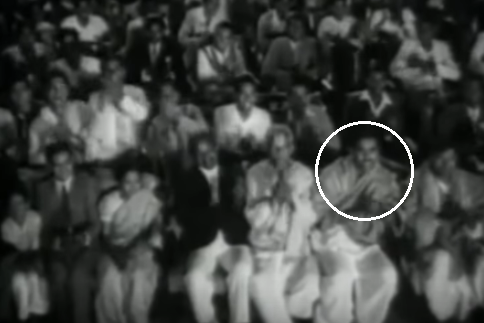
K. V. Reddy made a cameo in the song "Oho Tapodhana" as an audience member in Swargaseema (1945).

After the huge success of Bhakta Pothana, Narayana Swamy who had interests in other business ventures focused on film production. He made a proposal to the board to confine Vauhini Pictures to film distribution and start Vauhini Productions for film production. The proposal was approved, and Narayana Swamy invested ₹2 lakh out of the total capital of ₹2.5 lakh. Rest of the ₹50,000 was provided by the family of B. N. Reddy and K. V. Reddy. Thus, K. V. Reddy became a partner in Vauhini Productions. It was decided that B. N. Reddy and K. V. Reddy would alternately direct films for the production house. When Vauhini Productions made Swargaseema (1945) as its first production under the direction of B. N. Reddy, K. V. Reddy worked as a production manager for the film. Though the film faced troubles due to the shortage of film stock due to the world war, it became successful. K. V. Reddy also made a cameo appearance in the song "Oho Tapodhana".

==== Yogi Vemana (1947) ====
While working on Swargaseema, K. V. Reddy started preparing the script for his next directorial venture. Along with Samudrala Sr., he gathered information on Vemana from historical and folklore sources and prepared the script for Yogi Vemana (1947). K. V. Reddy collaborated once again with Nagayya who played the lead role. The film was critically acclaimed but underperformed commercially. Ashish Rajadhyaksha and Paul Willemen in Encyclopedia of Indian Cinema note, "Bhakta Pothana and Yogi Vemana, contributed to Chittor V Nagaiah’s image as South Indian cinema’s most famous actor in the saint film genre".

Around the same time, Vauhini Productions' films were getting delayed due to lack of studio facilities. And so, they decided to build a studio of their own. Narayana Swamy invested the capital required for building the studio while B. N. Reddy took up the responsibility of managing the construction work. Even though B. N. Reddy was to direct the next film for Vauhini as per the agreement, it fell upon K. V. Reddy to direct the next film as B. N. Reddy was busy in the construction work of the studio.

==== Gunasundari Katha (1949) ====
K. V. Reddy wanted to make a film that was distinct from his previous films and any of the films produced till then by Vauhini. He chose William Shakespeare's play King Lear as the inspiration for the core plot. But K. V. Reddy and his writers Pingali and Kamalakara Kameswara Rao changed the tone from the tragedy of King Lear to a more entertaining one for the film. Titled Gunasundari Katha (1949), the film was successful at the box-office. The film had a scene where the protagonist turns into a bear due to a curse. K. V. Reddy remembered a kind-hearted bear in his childhood which spared him his life and made it a character in the film. The film was later remade in Tamil as Gunasundari (1955) by Vijaya Productions under the direction of Kamalakara Kameswara Rao.

=== 1950–1963: Further critical and commercial success ===
==== Pathala Bhairavi (1951) ====
Nagi Reddi and Chakrapani signed K. V. Reddy in 1950 to direct Pathala Bhairavi. The film was based on a story from Kasi Majilee Kathalu, written by Madhira Subbanna Deekshitulu. Pingali adapted the content and wrote the film's story. Kamalakara Kameswara Rao and Reddy worked on the screenplay. Pingali was also inspired from the story of Aladdin. Pathala Bhairavi was made as a bilingual film, shot in Telugu and Tamil simultaneously with both the versions having the same title.

The film stars N. T. Rama Rao, S. V. Ranga Rao and K. Malathi. The film focuses on a gardener's son who has to amass wealth equal to that of the king of Ujjain to marry his daughter and a sorcerer who has to sacrifice an intelligent and brave young man to Goddess Pathala Bhairavi to gain access to a statuette which can grant any wish. As the film is shot as a bilingual, production lasted for a whole year starting from 5 February 1950 until 8 February 1951.

The Telugu version of Pathala Bhairavi was released on 15 March 1951, and the Tamil version on 17 May 1951. Both versions were commercially successful. Pathala Bhairavi became the first Telugu film to run continuously for 175 days, and the first Telugu film to have a direct run of 200 days. The 1952 Hindi version was also successful. Pathala Bhairavi is considered to be a breakthrough film for both Rama Rao and Ranga Rao. The success of the film established Vijaya Productions as a prominent production house in South Indian cinema. It was also the only South Indian film to be screened at the first International Film Festival of India held at Mumbai on 24 January 1952.

==== Pedda Manushulu (1954) ====
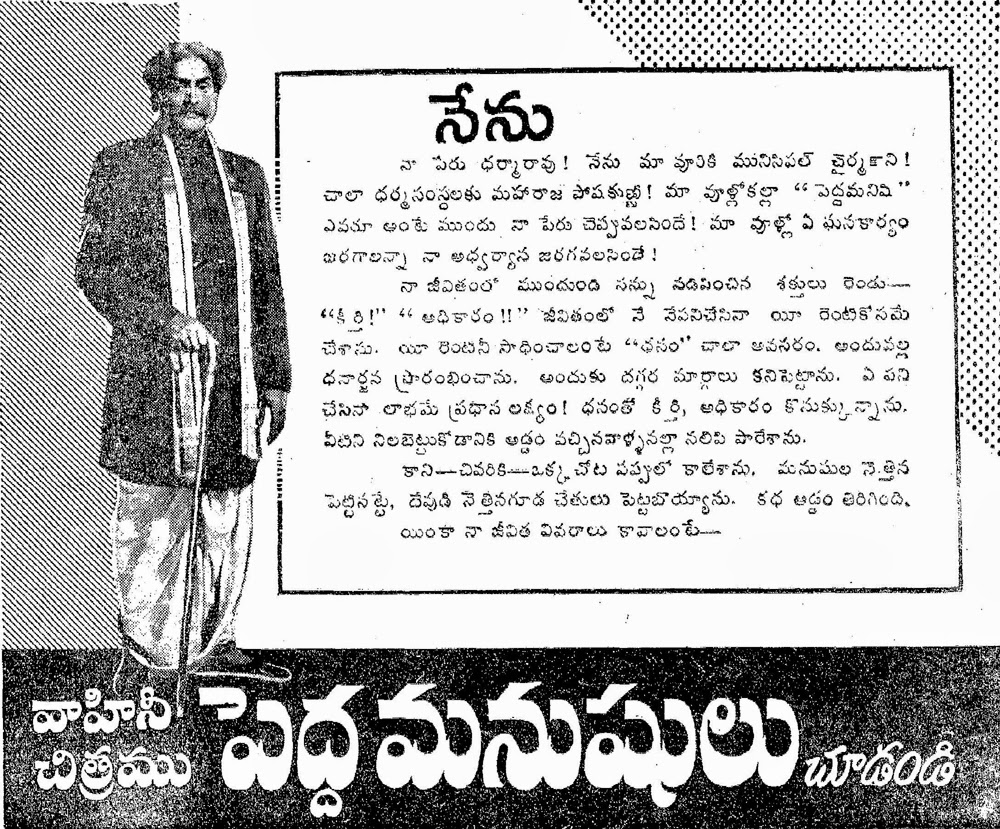
Pedda Manushulu poster

After the success of Pathala Bhairavi, Nagi Reddi asked K. V. Reddy to make another fantasy film for Vijaya Productions. But, after directing two historical films (Bhakta Pothana, Yogi Vemana) and two fantasy films (Gunasundari Katha, Pathala Bhairavi ), K. V. Reddy wanted to make a drama film this time. As B. N. Reddy and K. V. Reddy previously agreed to alternately direct films for Vauhini, K. V. Reddy planned to make his next film on Vauhini Productions banner.

K. V. Reddy was interested in western literature and films. The Pillars of Society, a 1877 play by famous Norwegian playwright Henrik Ibsen attracted him. He wanted to direct a film based on the play. He collaborated with D. V. Narasaraju and D. B. G. Tilak and prepared the script. Only two characters from the play were retained and rest of the story was newly developed by the writers.

The film titled Pedda Manushulu portrayed corruption among so called respectable persons of the society. It released on 11 March 1954 and was commercially successful. It became the first Telugu film to win the National Film Award. The film became a trendsetter for many later films with a similar theme. It showed that those who are considered Pedda Manushulu (transl. Gentlemen or transl. Respectable People) by the society are corrupt. After the film's release, the term Pedda Manushulu had negative connotations in Telugu culture for a long time. The film proved K. V. Reddy's capability in directing not only fantasy and mythological films, but also social dramas.

==== Donga Ramudu (1955) ====
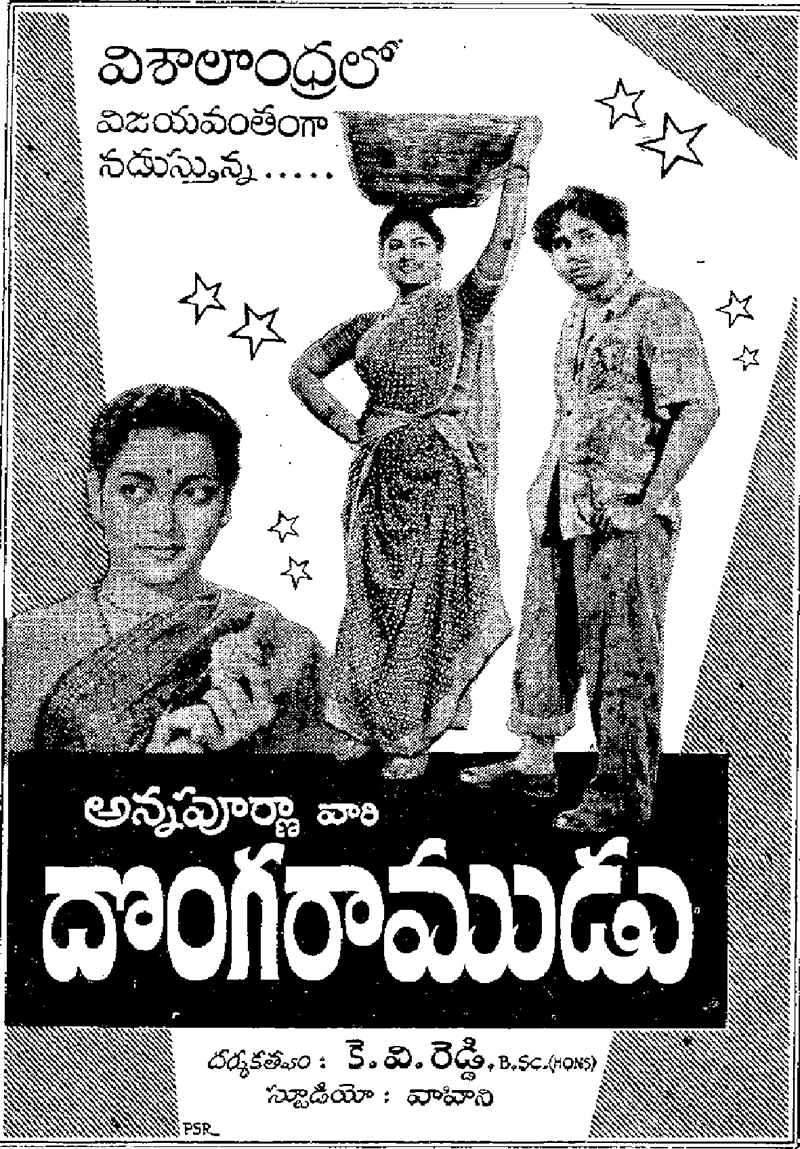
Poster of Donga Ramudu

After Akkineni Nageswara Rao became a major movie star in the early 1950s, his friend and mentor Dukkipati Madhusudhana Rao wanted to launch their own production company. They established Annapurna Pictures, named after Madhusudhana Rao’s stepmother. Madhusudana Rao, Nageswara Rao, and few others were its partners. They wanted K. V. Reddy to direct the first film for their banner and waited for more than two years for him.

D. V. Narasaraju, the writer of Pedda Manushulu was chosen to pen the story and dialogues. Since he was directing Nageswara Rao for the first time, K. V. Reddy thought it should be different from the actor's earlier films. He suggested a storyline on brother-sister sentiment with the brother going to any extent, even giving up his life for the sake of his sister. Madhusudana Rao recollected a short story, Loving Brothers that he had previously read. In the story, the elder brother commits robberies to educate his younger brother. Taking only that point, replacing the younger brother with a sister, Narasaraju, Madhusudana Rao and K. V. Reddy wrote the script of Donga Ramudu.

Released on 2 October 1955, Donga Ramudu became a super hit. The success of the film established Annapurna Pictures as a leading production house in Telugu cinema. The film was later archived by the curriculum of the Film and Television Institute of India. Donga Ramudu was dubbed in Tamil as Thiruttu Raman (1956) and was commercially successful. It was later remade in Hindi as Man-Mauji (1962) and again in Tamil as Vasanthi (1988).

==== Mayabazar (1957) ====
K. V. Reddy always had a vision of making a film based on itihas with huge sets similar to Hollywood films. He found support from Vijaya Productions founded by Nagi Reddi and Chakrapani. After the success of Pathala Bhairavi, Vijaya Productions selected the film's technical crew for an adaptation of Sasirekha Parinayam, also known as Mayabazar. The eighth adaptation of the folk tale Sasirekha Parinayam, it was the studio's first film on itihas. K. V. Reddy wrote and directed Mayabazar, assisted by Singeetam Srinivasa Rao. It was produced by Nagi Reddi and Chakrapani. Nearly a year was spent on pre-production and casting. Pingali wrote the story, dialogues, and lyrics. The film was produced in Telugu and Tamil versions, with a slightly different cast for each. N. T. Rama Rao, hesitant to play Krishna after a negative response to his cameo appearance in Sonta Ooru (1956), agreed at K. V. Reddy's insistence and special care was taken with his costume and body language; Mayabazar was the first of Rama Rao's many appearances as Krishna. During rehearsals, K. V. Reddy timed his actors with a stopwatch, calculating the length of each scene (including songs) to determine the film's length. D. S. Ambu Rao, Bartley's assistant, said that Mayabazar was shot according to the screenplay and Bartley's lighting. In addition to the principal technicians and actors, a crew of 400, including light men, carpenters, and painters, worked on Mayabazar during production.

The Telugu version of Mayabazar was released on 27 March 1957, and the Tamil version two weeks later on 12 April. Both versions have a film-reel length of 5,888 metres (19,318 ft). A commercial success, Mayabazar had a theatrical run of 100 days in 24 theatres and went on to become a silver jubilee film with a theatrical run of 175 days (25 weeks) Mayabazar was the first colourised Telugu film, with its audio remastered from monaural to a DTS 5.1-channel system.

Mayabazar is considered as a classic in Telugu cinema, particularly in its use of technology. Various words and phrases, such as "antha alamalame kada" ("Is everything fine?"), "Asamadiyulu" ("Friends"), "Tasamadiyulu" ("Enemies"), "Gilpam" and "Gimbali" ("bed-" and "room-mat"), later became part of Telugu vernacular.

==== Pellinaati Pramanalu (1958) ====
K. V. Reddy founded a production company named Jayanthi Pictures, in partnership with P. S. Reddy and Tikkavarapu Pattabhirama Reddy. K. V. Reddy liked the film The Seven Year Itch (1955) and wanted to make a film on the same theme. He initially wanted to make this film for Annapurna Pictures' maiden production, but dropped the idea as the producer D. Madhusudhana Rao was not keen on it. He chose this idea for Jayanthi Pictures' first project.

Titled Pellilnati Pramanalu, the film starred Akkineni Nageswara Rao and Jamuna, with music composed by Ghantasala. The film was simultaneously made in Tamil as Vaazhkai Oppandham with a slightly different cast that released the following year. The Telugu version was released on 12 December 1958 and the Tamil film on 4 September 1959. The Telugu version was above average at the box-office while the Tamil film fared average but recovered its money through pre-selling. At the 6th National Film Awards, Pellinaati Pramanalu won the award for Best Feature Film in Telugu.

==== Declining Sita Rama Kalyanam (1961) ====
N. T. Rama Rao's brother N. Trivikrama Rao decided to produce a film based on Ramayana for his company National Art Theatre. Rama Rao's portrayal of the Ravana in Bhookailas (1958) earned him critical acclaim. Also, Ravana's reputation as a renowned Lord Siva devotee, made Rama Rao consider reprising the role in this film with a more layered representation of the character.

Rama Rao approached his mentor K. V. Reddy to direct the film. But, K. V. Reddy wanted Rama Rao to don the role of Lord Rama and S. V. Ranga Rao to play the character of Ravana. Since Rama Rao was adamant about playing Ravana, K. V. Reddy declined the offer, saying that he could not envision Rama Rao playing a demon. Rama Rao then decided to direct the film himself, marking his directorial debut with the film titled Sita Rama Kalyanam (1961).

==== Jagadeka Veeruni Katha (1961) ====
K. V. Reddy's next project was the Vijaya Productions' fantasy film Jagadeka Veeruni Katha (1961). The film was adapted from a popular Tamil folktale on which a previous film, Pakshiraja Films’ Jagathalapratapan (1944) was also based. Screenwriter Pingali and K. V. Reddy took the core plot from Jagathala Prathapan, but added new characters, made other changes to the story and prepared the script of Jagadeka Veeruni Katha which made it quite distinct from the 1944 film.

The film starred N. T. Rama Rao, B. Saroja Devi, and Rajanala with music composed by Pendyala. Released on 9 August 1961, the film was a box office success. The film was also dubbed into Bengali, Hindi, Kannada, Odia, and Tamil.

==== Sri Krishnarjuna Yuddhamu (1963) ====
K. V. Reddy’s next project was the mythological film Sri Krishnarjuna Yuddhamu (1963). The film was based on the popular Telugu play Gayopakhyanam written by Chilakamarti Lakshmi Narasimham in 1890. K. V. Reddy also produced the film under the Jayanthi Pictures banner.

The film stars N. T. Rama Rao as Krishna and Akkineni Nageswara Rao as Arjuna. Initially, Nageswara Rao was not keen on acting in a mythological film alongside Rama Rao. However, he accepted the role due to his respect towards K. V. Reddy for having directed Donga Ramudu (1955), the maiden venture of his own production house Annapurna Pictures. Sri Krishnarjuna Yuddhamu became a commercial success. The film was later dubbed into Kannada and Tamil.

=== 1964–1970: Decline ===
==== Satya Harishchandra (1965) ====
After the success of Sri Krishnarjuna Yuddhamu based on popular mythological play Gayopakhyanam, K. V. Reddy planned a film based on another mythological play Satya Harishchandra for Vijaya Productions. The songs and poems written by Balijepalli Lakshmikantha Kavi for his magnum opus play Satya Harischandriyamu in 1924 were already popular with the audience. However, due to copyright issues, K. V. Reddy could not use those poems. Pingali wrote new poems and songs for the film. K. V. Reddy also produced the film for Vijaya Productions. The film titled Satya Harishchandra starred N. T. Rama Rao in the title role and S. Varalakshmi as Chandramathi. The film released on 22 April 1965 and was a failure at the box-office. Audience accustomed to the old poems of Lakshmikantha Kavi were disappointed with the new ones and this was attributed as one of the reasons for the failure of the film.

K. V. Reddy produced the film simultaneously in Kannada with the same title, starring Dr Rajkumar. The Kannada film was hugely successful at the time of its release and is seen as a milestone in Kannada cinema. It won the President's silver medal for Best Feature Film in Kannada at the 13th National Film Awards. It also became the third Indian and the first South Indian black-and-white film to be digitally coloured in 2008.

==== Uma Chandi Gowri Sankarula Katha (1968) ====
K. V. Reddy's next film was Uma Chandi Gowri Sankarula Katha (1968). It is a mythological film produced by Nagi Reddi and Chakrapani under the Vijaya Productions banner. The film starred N. T. Rama Rao as Lord Siva and B. Saroja Devi in a triple role as Uma, Chandi and Gowri. Released on 11 January 1968, the film was a commercial failure.

==== Bhagya Chakramu (1968) ====
After directing two consecutive flop films for Vijaya Productions, technicians and crew who were a part of K. V. Reddy’s team and were being employed by Vijaya Productions on a monthly salary basis were laid off by the company. This caused a stir in the film industry.

K. V. Reddy started directing a folklore film titled Bhagya Chakramu for his own production company, Jayanthi Pictures with N. T. Rama Rao in the lead role. K. V. Reddy clashed with his partners in Jayanthi Pictures during the production. Though he was credited as the director and producer, K. V. Reddy’s involvement in the making of the film was less. The film released on 13 September 1968 and was also a failure at the box-office.

=== 1971–1972: Ending on a high note ===
==== Sri Krishna Satya (1971) ====
After the failure of Bhagya Chakramu, K. V. Reddy had no offers for two years. He also felt humiliated by the layoff of his collaborators by Vijaya Productions. He was worried about not directing another successful film and ending his career as a director with three failures in his last stage. He started assisting in the script work of others’ films.

In this situation, N. T. Rama Rao approached him with two scripts written by his collaborator Pingali — Chanakya Chandragupta and Sri Krishna Satya. He offered K. V. Reddy the choice of directing either of the scripts for Rama Rao's own production house. K. V. Reddy chose the latter. The plot of Sri Krishna Satya is linked to both Treta Yuga and Dvapara Yuga. The film stars N. T. Rama Rao as Lord Krishna and Jayalalithaa as his consort Satyabhama. After shooting a large part of the film, K. V. Reddy fell ill. Then, Rama Rao finished the remaining portions under the supervision of K. V. Reddy. Sri Krishna Satya released on 24 December 1971 and was commercially successful. The film won the Nandi Award for Second Best Feature Film for the year 1971.

Directing the film and its success gave a lot of satisfaction to K. V. Reddy. He wanted to make one more successful film and then retire to his hometown Tadipatri. As his health deteriorated, he could not fulfil his wish and died on 15 September 1972.

== Personal life ==
K. V. Reddy married Seshamma. They had nine children — five daughters and four sons. When Seshamma was diagnosed with cancer, he was depressed and stopped taking his medicines for Diabetes and Hypertension.

His children were featured in the song "Bhale Thatha Mana Bapuji" in Donga Ramudu (1955). His son Srinivasa Reddy worked as an assistant director to his father on Uma Chandi Gowri Sankarula Katha (1968) and Bhagya Chakramu (1968). Another son K. Ramachandra Reddy was educated at IIT. He is a serial entrepreneur and worked in US for 30 years. He founded Moschip Technologies Ltd. in 1999 in Hyderabad. As of 2015, it is the only publicly traded fab-less semiconductor company based in India.

K. V. Reddy died on 15 September 1972. His wife also died three months after his death.

== Filmmaking style ==
K. V. Reddy was a perfectionist who was passionate about filmmaking. Singeetam Srinivasa Rao, who assisted K. V. Reddy for over a decade, mentions that he had a ‘scientific approach’ to filmmaking. He would always work with a bound script. Everything regarding the film would already be written in the script prior to the commencement of filming — dialogues, shot division, camera angles, props on the set etc. Once the script is finalized, he would not make any changes to it during the shooting. He used stopwatch to time his actors calculating the length of each scene to determine the film's length.

He was careful in finishing the film within the range of film stock that was planned to be used during preproduction. He was also mindful of finishing the film within the range of pre-planned budget. Editing would only start after the completion of shooting.

He was also particular about casting. He was insistent on casting N. T. Rama Rao for the role of Lord Krishna in Mayabazar, though many members of the production opposed it. N. T. Rama Rao followed the filmmaking style of K. V. Reddy after he became a director and was successful.

== Collaborators ==
K. V. Reddy is noted for his collaboration with writer Pingali which produced many successful films. K. V. Reddy also introduced D. V. Narasaraju, who became a noted screenwriter, into the film industry. He also collaborated with Marcus Bartley on most of his films. Pendyala worked as a music composer for seven of his films, while Ghantasala composed the music for three films. Ogirala Ramachandra Rao and Nagayya composed music for three and two films respectively. Singeetam Srinivasa Rao, who would later become a doyen of South Indian cinema, worked with K. V. Reddy from Donga Ramudu (1955) till Uma Chandi Gowri Sankarula Katha (1968). He initially joined Reddy as an apprentice and later became an assistant director in his team.

N. T. Rama Rao collaborated with him on eight of his films. Akkineni Nageswara Rao acted in four films of his. Nagayya played the lead role in K. V. Reddy’s first two films — Bhakta Potana, Yogi Vemana and later played supporting roles in three films. S. V. Ranga Rao acted in three of his films — Pathala Bhairavi, Pellinaati Pramanalu, Sri Krishna Satya. B. Saroja Devi played the female lead in four of his films. Savitri and Jamuna each played the female lead in two of K. V. Reddy’s films.

== Legacy ==
I was 7-8 years old when I first saw it [Mayabazaar] as a kid, I loved it immensely. Later, when I came to the film industry, I kept thinking about how KV Reddy and his team made the film back in those days. I was mesmerised by the visual effects in that film. Later, while making Yamadonga, my VFX supervisor and I spent two days just to figure out how KV Reddy had pulled off such amazing special effects back then. The more I explored the world of Mayabazaar, my respect for KV Reddy kept growing.

— S. S. Rajamouli about K. V. Reddy.

Noted director S. S. Rajamouli cited K. V. Reddy as the Indian director who had the biggest influence on him.

A street was named after him in his hometown Tadipatri. In 2012, on the occasion of K. V. Reddy’s birth centenary, a book on his film career was written by H. Ramesh Babu and Tanneeru Srinivas.

On the centenary of Indian cinema in April 2013, CNN-IBN included Pathala Bhairavi and Mayabazar in its list of "100 greatest Indian films of all time". In an online poll conducted by CNN-IBN among those 100 films, Mayabazar was voted by the public as the "greatest Indian film of all time."

Archana Nathan of Scroll.in called K. V. Reddy, "the original fantasy movie king". She added that Pathala Bhairavi successfully revived the adventure fantasy genre when it was declared that the genre had run out of steam.

Vedantam Sripatisarma, a film critic, wrote of him, "Kadiri Venkata Reddy stands out as one of the most seasoned minds of yesteryears who missed no moment in entertaining the viewer even inside a subject involving melancholy and drama. His style of comedy was absolutely unimaginable. His ways never appeared to be contrived. There was this great ease with which he moved his subjects."

== Filmography ==
K. V. Reddy directed 14 feature films.

Directed features
Year	Title	Language	Direction	Screenplay	Story	Producer
1942	Bhakta Potana	Telugu	Yes	No	No	No
1947	Yogi Vemana	Telugu	Yes	Yes	No	Yes
1949	Gunasundari Katha	Telugu	Yes	Yes	No	Yes
1951	Pathala Bhairavi	Telugu; Tamil	Yes	Yes	No	No
1954	Pedda Manushulu	Telugu	Yes	Yes	Yes	Yes
1955	Donga Ramudu	Telugu	Yes	Yes	Yes	No
1957	Mayabazar	Telugu; Tamil	Yes	Yes	No	No
1958	Pellinaati Pramanalu	Telugu	Yes	No	Yes	Yes
1961	Jagadeka Veeruni Katha	Telugu	Yes	Yes	No	Yes
1963	Sri Krishnarjuna Yuddhamu	Telugu	Yes	Yes	No	Yes
1965	Satya Harishchandra	Telugu	Yes	Yes	No	Yes
1968	Uma Chandi Gowri Sankarula Katha	Telugu	Yes	Yes	Yes	No
1968	Bhagya Chakramu	Telugu	Yes	Yes	No	No
1971	Sri Krishna Satya	Telugu	Yes	Yes	No	No

Other roles

- Satya Harishchandra (1965) (Kannada) - Producer
- Swarga Seema (1945) - Production manager
- Devata (1941) - Production manager
- Sumangali (1940) - Production manager
- Vande Mataram (1939) - Production manager

== Awards ==
National Film Awards

- National Film Award for Best Feature Film in Telugu - Pedda Manushulu (1955)
- National Film Award for Best Feature Film in Telugu - Pellinaati Pramanalu (1958)
- National Film Award for Best Feature Film in Kannada - Satya Harishchandra (1966)

Filmfare Awards South

- Filmfare Best Director Award (Telugu) - Sri Krishna Satya (1972)

== In popular culture ==
K. V. Reddy is portrayed by director Krish Jagarlamudi in the films Mahanati (2018) and NTR: Kathanayakudu (2019).

== Bibliography ==
- Pulagam Chinnarayana (2019), Mayabazar Madhura Smruthulu, Chennai: Vijaya Publications
- D. V. Narasaraju (2004), Tera Venuka Kathalu, Hyderabad: Creative Links
- U. Vinayaka Rao (2012), Telugu Cine Rangam - Pouranika Chitralu, Hyderabad: Telugu Academy
