= Mudigonda Lingamurthy =

Indian actor

- Born: 10 October 1908; Tenali, India
- Died: 24 January 1980 (aged 71)
- Occupation: Actor

Mudigonda Lingamurthy, shortly Lingamurthy (Telugu: ముదిగొండ లింగమూర్తి) (10 October 1908 – 24 January 1980), was an Indian film character actor known for his works in Telugu cinema and theater.

== Life sketch ==
Mudigonda Lingamurthy was born to a Hindu Shaiva family in Tenali, Andhra Pradesh. He used to play in school dramas in his childhood. He was very fond of arts and was introduced to Sthanam Narasimha Rao, a Telugu theater artist and a Padma Shri awardee. He joined Rama Vilasa Sabha of Tenali where he portrayed different characters in Kanyasulkam, Pratapa Rudreeyam and other dramas. He acted as Ramappa Pantulu character in Kanyasulkam drama.

He moved to filmdom in 1937 and acted in the movie Tukaram along with V. Nagayya. He later joined Vijaya Vauhini Studios and was associated with them for about 7 years and acted as Ajamila in Bhakta Pothana, Gangadu in Swarga Seema, Abhirama in Yogi Vemana and Ramadasu in Peddamanushulu. He was closely associated with V. Nagayya and acted in his films like Tyagayya, Naa Illu and Ramadasu. In total Lingamurthy acted in about 70 films.

Lingamurthy wrote some playlets including Venkanna Kapuram, Pelli Choopulu, Thyagam.

He was founder member of Cine Technicians Association. He also held the post of Secretary and Chairperson of the Association. He retired from the profession after his shashthipurti celebrations.

After the death of his wife, Durgavardhanamma in 1974, he took Sanyasa as is custom in Indian families. He died in 1980.

A mini hall named after him still exists today at the place where he lived in Nana Street, T. Nagar, Chennai.

== Filmography ==
This is partial list of his films. Please help expand the list.

Year	Film	Language	Character
1937	Tukaram	Telugu	
1939	Vandemataram	Telugu	
1940	Sumangali	Telugu	
1941	Bhaktimala	Telugu	
1941	Devatha	Telugu	
1943	Bhakta Pothana	Telugu	Ajamila
1943	Panthulamma	Telugu	
1945	Swargaseema	Telugu	Father of Subbalaxmi
1946	Narada Naradi	Telugu	
1946	Thyagayya	Telugu	Japesen
1947	Yogi Vemana	Telugu	Abhirama
1947	Palnati Yudham	Telugu	Narsingaraju
1949	Dharmangada	Telugu	
1952	Dharmadevata	Telugu	King Veerasena
1953	En Veedu	Tamil	
1953	Naa Illu	Telugu	Dhanraj
1954	Peddamanushulu	Telugu	Newspaper Editor
1954	Bedara Kannappa	Kannada	Kailasanatha Sastry
1954	Sri Kalahastiswara Mahatyam	Telugu	Kailasanatha Sastry
1960	Mahakavi Kalidasu	Telugu	King
1961	Batasari	Telugu	Diwan at Zamindari
1962	Mahamantri Timmarasu	Telugu	Hamvira
1964	Ramadasu	Telugu	
1965	Zamindar	Telugu	Narahari
1965	Pandava Vanavasam	Telugu	Shakuni
1966	Srikakula Andhra Maha Vishnu Katha	Telugu	Mahendrajit, the minister
1967	Shri Krishnavataram	Telugu	Shakuni
1968	Bhagya Chakramu	Telugu	Dharmapala Maharaja
