= Gruhalakshmi (1938 film) =

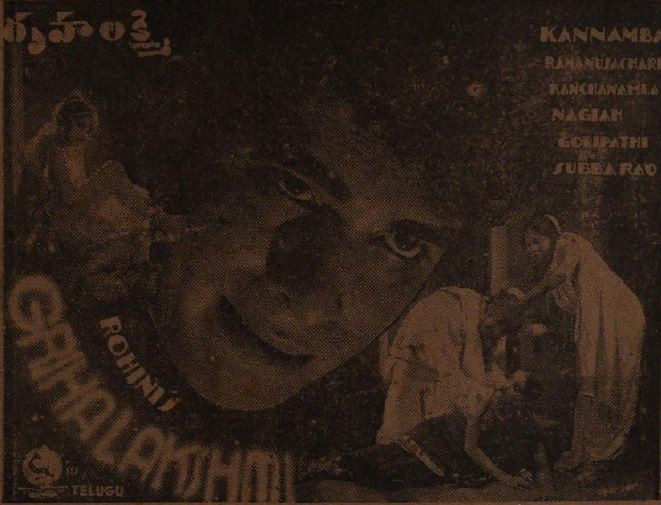
- Directed by: H. M. Reddy
- Written by: Samudrala Sr.
- Produced by: H. M. Reddy
- Starring: V. Nagayya; Ramanujachari; Jandhyala Gaurinatha Sastri; Govindarajula Subba Rao; Kannamba; Kanchanamala; Sarala; Mohini
- Cinematography: K. Ramnoth
- Music by: Prabhala Satyanarayana
- Production company: Rohini Pictures
- Release date: March 12, 1938
- Running time: 184 minutes
- Country: India
- Language: Telugu

Gruhalakshmi is a 1938 Indian Telugu-language drama film produced and directed by H. M. Reddy. Starring Ramanujacharyulu, Kanchanamala, Kannamba, and V. Nagayya, it was the debut production of Rohini Pictures and marked the cinematic debut of V. Nagayya. The film was an adaptation of the 1929 stage play Rangoon Rowdy by Somaraju Ramanuja Rao and was a commercial success. Gruhalakshmi is notable for introducing Kanchanamala as Telugu cinema's first "oomph" girl, gaining widespread attention for its daring portrayal of sensuality. The film also marked an early career role for K. V. Reddy, who worked as a cashier for Rohini Pictures before becoming a renowned filmmaker.

== Plot ==
The story revolves around Dr. Krishna Rao (played by Ramanujacharyulu), a happily married man living with his devoted wife Radha (Kannamba). Madhuri (Kanchanamala), a woman of questionable morals, enters Krishna Rao's life and tries to seduce him, leading to turmoil in his otherwise stable life. Madhuri's attempts to lure Krishna Rao form a central part of the plot, and her character is portrayed as a seductress who uses her beauty and charm to manipulate men.

== Cast ==
- Kanchanamala as Madhuri
- Ramanujacharyulu as Dr. Krishna Rao
- Kannamba as Radha
- Chittoor V. Nagayya as Gopinath, Radha's elder brother

== Production ==
Gruhalakshmi was filmed at Kartikeya Studio in Madras, established by cinematographer K. Ramnoth and art director A. K. Sekhar. Although the film's video footage is now lost, some of its audio recordings, including the song Bigi kougita jerpaga raaraa, have been preserved. The song, composed by Prabhala Sathyanarayana, was a semi-classical piece that was considered bold for its time and is comparable to modern "item" songs in terms of its provocative nature.

This film was the debut of V. Nagayya, who played Gopinath, a social reformer and the elder brother of Radha, one of the main characters. Ramanujacharyulu, a well-known lawyer and stage actor famous for his role as Gireesam in Kanyasulkam, portrayed Dr. Krishna Rao. This was the only film in which Ramanujacharyulu appeared.

The character of Madhuri, played by Kanchanamala, was modeled after Kitty Packard, a character portrayed by Jean Harlow in George Cukor's 1933 American film Dinner at Eight. Like Kitty, Madhuri is a seductive woman who uses her beauty to manipulate a wealthy man, in this case, Dr. Krishna Rao. Madhuri's character was considered groundbreaking for Telugu cinema due to its bold depiction of female sensuality.

One of the film's key moments is a sensual dance sequence performed by Kanchanamala, which is regarded as the first of its kind in Telugu cinema. The song Bigi kougita jerpaga raaraa was written by Samudrala Sr. (credited as S. V. Raghavacharya) and composed by Prabhala Sathyanarayana. Despite not being a trained singer, Kanchanamala performed the song herself, as playback singing was not yet common in Telugu cinema.

== Music ==
The music of Gruhalakshmi was composed by Prabhala Satyanarayana, with lyrics written by Samudrala Raghavacharya (credited as S. V. Raghavacharya). The soundtrack of Gruhalakshmi includes several songs, such as:

- Badha Sahaname
- Kallu Manandoi Kallu Teravandoi
- Lendu Bharata Veeru Laara
- Naa Premaye
- Sagamu Ratiri Ayyane
- Yasodha Nandana

== Reception ==
Gruhalakshmi was a commercial success, mainly due to Kanchanamala's portrayal of Madhuri and the comedic elements in the film. The film significantly enhanced Kanchanamala's popularity, especially among younger audiences.

However, its content did not align with the aesthetic preferences of filmmaker B. N. Reddi. This difference in vision led B. N. Reddi to leave Rohini Pictures and establish Vauhini Pictures with Nagi Reddi, K. V. Reddi, K. Ramnoth, and A. K. Sekhar, with the goal of producing films with a focus on artistic quality.

== Legacy ==
Gruhalakshmi is remembered for its daring themes and its pioneering depiction of female sensuality in Telugu cinema. Kanchanamala's portrayal of Madhuri introduced the concept of the "oomph" girl to Telugu films and set the stage for similar roles in the future. The film's blend of commercial success and bold content marked a turning point in Telugu cinema, fusing traditional storytelling with more modern, provocative expressions.
