= Yogi Vemana (film) =

- Poster
- Directed by: K. V. Reddy
- Screenplay by: K. V. Reddy; Kamalakara Kameswara Rao
- Dialogue by: Samudrala Sr.
- Produced by: K. V. Reddy
- Starring: V. Nagayya; Mudigonda Lingamurthy; M. V. Rajamma; Doraiswamy; Parvatibai; Bezawada Rajaratnam; B. Padmanabham; Baby Krishnaveni
- Cinematography: Marcus Bartley
- Music by: V. Nagayya; Ogirala Ramchandra Rao
- Production company: Vauhini Studios
- Release date: 10 April 1947
- Country: India
- Language: Telugu

Yogi Vemana is a 1947 Telugu-language biographical film produced and directed by K. V. Reddy. The story is based on the life of saint poet Vemana. V. Nagayya played the role of Vemana and also composed music and sang many poems and songs in this film exposing his multifaceted talents.

== Cast ==
- V. Nagayya as Vemana
- Mudigonda Lingamurthy as Abhirama
- M. V. Rajamma
- Doraiswamy
- Parvatibai
- Baby Krishnaveni as Jyoti
- Bezawada Rajarathnam
- B. Padmanabham

== Crew ==
- Director: K. V. Reddy
- Screenplay: K. V. Reddy, Kamalakara Kameswara Rao
- Assistant Director: Kamalakara Kameswara Rao
- Dialogues and Songs: Samudrala Sr.
- Producer: K. V. Reddy
- Production Company: Vauhini Studios
- Original Music: V. Nagayya and Ogirala Ramchandra Rao
- Cinematography: Marcus Bartley
- Sound: A Krishnan
- Playback singers: V. Nagayya, M. V. Rajamma, Bezawada Rajarathnam, Ghantasala
- Choreographer: Vedantam Raghavayya

== Songs ==
- "Amdalu Chimdeti Na Jyoti" (Lyricist: Samudrala; Singer: Nagayya; Music: Nagayya)
- "Aparani Tapamayera" (Lyricist: Samudrala; Singer: M. V. Rajamma and Ghantasala; Music: Nagayya)
- "Evari Nirmanamo" (Lyricist: Samudrala; Singer: Nagayya; Music: Nagayya)
- "Idena Imtena" (Lyricist: Samudrala; Singer: Nagayya; Music: Nagayya)
- "Jiva Himsa" (Lyricist: Samudrala; Singer: Nagayya; Music: Nagayya)
- "Kanupimchumura" (Lyricist: Samudrala; Singer: Nagayya; Music: Nagayya)
- "Manasa Mayanu Padaku" (Lyricist: Samudrala; Music: Nagayya)
- "Sevaka Jana" (Lyricist: Samudrala; Singer: M. V. Rajamma; Music: Nagayya)
- "Tadavayanika Levara" (Lyricist: Samudrala; Singer: Nagayya; Music: Nagayya)
- "Tadavayanika Levara" (Lyricist: Samudrala; Singer: M. V. Rajamma; Music: Nagayya)
- "Vadhalajalara" (Lyricist: Samudrala; Music: Nagayya)
- "Vachche Poye" (Lyricist: Samudrala; Music: Nagayya)
- "Veladulara" (Lyricist: Samudrala; Music: Nagayya)
- "Vamaa Padyamulu" (Lyricist: Vemana; Singer: Nagayya; Music: Nagayya)
