= Rajanala =

Rajanala is a Telugu surname. Notable people with the surname include:

- Rajanala Kaleswara Rao (1925–1998), Telugu film actor
- Rajanala Nageswara Rao (1928–1959), Telugu actor
