= Vaazhkai Oppandham =

- Poster
- Directed by: K. V. Reddy
- Screenplay by: K. V. Reddy
- Story by: Pingali
- Produced by: K. V. Reddy
- Starring: Akkineni Nageswara Rao; Jamuna
- Cinematography: K. S. Prasad
- Edited by: M. S. Mani
- Music by: Ghantasala
- Production company: Jayanthi Pictures
- Release date: 4 September 1959
- Running time: 172 minutes
- Country: India
- Language: Tamil

Vaazhkai Oppandham (transl. The Contract of Life) is a 1959 Indian Tamil-language comedy drama film, produced and directed by K. V. Reddy. It stars Akkineni Nageswara Rao and Jamuna, with music composed by Ghantasala. The film was simultaneously made in Telugu as Pellinaati Pramanalu (1958) with a slightly different cast, but was released on 4 September 1959.

== Cast ==
- Akkineni Nageswara Rao as Krishnan
- Jamuna as Rukmini
- K. Sarangapani
- Rajasulochana as Radha
- M. N. Nambiar
- T. P. Muthulakshmi
- S. V. Ranga Rao as Rukmini's father
- A. Karunanidhi
- Thanjai N. Ramaiah Dass as a socialist leader (cameo appearance)

== Soundtrack ==
Music was composed by Ghantasala. Lyrics were written by Thanjai N. Ramaiah Dass.

Song title	Singers	Length
"Brandhaavana Vennilaave Bedham Innum Eno"	Ghantasala & P. Leela	2:35
"Naanalla Yenbadhum... Kanivudan Paaraayo Endhan"	Ghantasala	2:31
"Neethaane Logamum Neethaane Sorgamum"	Ghantasala & P. Leela	3:02
"Idhaya Vaanil Udhaymaana Nilave"	Ghantasala & P. Leela	2:28
"Krishnaa... Ennaiye Marandhe Azhaitthadhinaale"	P. Susheela	3:21
"Ponaa Varaadhu Idhu Pozhudu Pona Kidaikkadhu"	Jikki	2:44
"Vaaraai Aaruyir Raadhaa En Vaazhvin Selvam"	Ghantasala & P. Susheela	2:55
"Jeyame Nee Arul Engal Sendhamizh Thaaye"	P. Leela	3:10
"Aaraaro Aaraaro Anbe Kann Valaraai"	P. Leela	3:03
"Kocchi Malai Kudagu Malai Engal Naadu"	T. V. Rathnam	3:23
"Rambaiyum Oorvasiyum"	Thiruchi Loganathan	3:03

== Release and reception ==
Vaazhkai Oppandham was released on 4 September 1959, nearly a year after its Telugu version. It was previously scheduled for 27 March. Kanthan of Kalki criticised the film's play-like feel, and felt it was perpetuating this flaw of Tamil cinema. The film performed average at the box office, though it recovered its investment.
