= Satya Harishchandra (1965 Kannada film) =

1965 film by Hunsur Krishnamurthy

- DVD Cover
- Directed by: Hunsur Krishnamurthy
- Screenplay by: K. V. Reddy
- Based on: Harishchandra Kavya by Raghavanka
- Produced by: K. V. Reddy
- Starring: Dr. Rajkumar; Pandari Bai; Udaykumar; Narasimharaju; M. P. Shankar; Rajasree
- Cinematography: Madhav Bulbule
- Edited by: G. Kalyana Sundaram; D. G. Jayaram
- Music by: Pendyala Nageswara Rao
- Production company: Vijaya Productions
- Release date: 12 April 1965
- Running time: 221 minutes
- Country: India
- Language: Kannada
- Budget: ₹800,000

Satya Harischandra is a 1965 Indian Kannada epic film directed by Hunsur Krishnamurthy and produced by K. V. Reddy. It stars Dr. Rajkumar in the lead role as Harishchandra, a mythological Indian king renowned for upholding truth and justice under any circumstance. The film is based on poet Raghavanka's work, Harishchandra Kavya. The supporting cast includes Udaykumar, Pandari Bai, Narasimharaju, M. P. Shankar, K. S. Ashwath and Baby Padmini. This is the second Kannada film based on king Harishchandra, with the first being the 1943 film Satya Harishchandra.

K. V. Reddy simultaneously produced a Telugu version of the film, also titled Satya Harishchandra which starred N. T. Rama Rao. At the 13th National Film Awards, the Kannada version of the film was awarded the President's silver medal for the Best Feature Film in Kannada. The film was major success upon its release and is considered a milestone in Kannada cinema. Satya Harishchandra was the third Indian film and the first South Indian film to be digitally coloured. The digitally coloured version, released in April 2008, was a commercial success.

== Cast ==
- Dr. Rajkumar as Harishchandra
- Pandari Bai as Chandramathi
- Udaykumar as Vishvamitra
- Narasimharaju as Nakshatrika
- M. P. Shankar as Veerabaahu
- K. S. Ashwath as Vashistha
- Baby Padmini as Lohitashva
- H. R. Shastry as Gowthama Muni at Indra's court
- M. S. Subbanna as Kalakoushika
- Kupparaju as disciple of Kalakoushika
- Dwarakish as disciple of Kalakoushika
- Nagesh as disciple of Kalakoushika
- Ramadevi as Kalaha Kanti, wife of Kalakoushika
- Rathnakar as disciple of Kalakoushika
- L. Vijayalakshmi
- Rajasree
- Meenakumari
- Vanisri as dancer in the song Nanna Neenu ninna naanu

== Production ==
The film was shot mostly shot at the AVM Studios in Madras (now Chennai). Singeetam Srinivasa Rao worked as an assistant director in this movie.

== Soundtrack ==
Satya Harishchandra

Soundtrack album by P. N. Rao
- Genre: Feature film soundtrack
- Label: Saregama

Pendyala Nageswara Rao composed the soundtrack for Satya Harishchandra, with lyrics written by Hunsur Krishnamurthy. The soundtrack album features twenty tracks. The song "Kuladalli Keelyavudo" was particularly well-received and became a popular curtain-closing song for many stage shows in Karnataka. The song was later remixed in 2017 film of same name starring Sharan.

Track list
No.	Title	Lyrics	Singer(s)	Length
1.	"Vande Suranam Saramsha"	Hunsur Krishnamurthy	Ghantasala	1:12
2.	"Hey Chandrachooda"	Hunsur Krishnamurthy	P. Leela, Ghantasala	2:49
3.	"Neenu Namage"	Hunsur Krishnamurthy	P. Leela, P. Susheela	3:47
4.	"Vamshavanu Mundarisali"	Hunsur Krishnamurthy	Ghantasala
5.	"Ananda Sadana"	Hunsur Krishnamurthy	P. Susheela	2:53
6.	"Naana Deva Dhanagalum"	Hunsur Krishnamurthy	Ghantasala	0:49
7.	"Sathyavanu Paalisalu"	Hunsur Krishnamurthy	Ghantasala	0:49
8.	"Enidi Grahacharavo"	Hunsur Krishnamurthy	Ghantasala	4:17
9.	"Thillana"	Hunsur Krishnamurthy	P. Leela, Pasumarthi Krishnamurthy	4:30
10.	"Lakshmi Ksheerasamudra"	Hunsur Krishnamurthy	P. Leela	1:54
11.	"Kaleda Kaladalu"	Hunsur Krishnamurthy	Nagendrappa	1:58
12.	"Kanasallu Nenasallu"	Hunsur Krishnamurthy	Ghantasala	1:33
13.	"Sathyavadu Naashavaaguva"	Hunsur Krishnamurthy	P. Leela	0:51
14.	"Kuladalli Keelyavudo"	Hunsur Krishnamurthy	Ghantasala	3:24
15.	"Nanna Neenu"	Hunsur Krishnamurthy	Swarnalatha, Jagannath	2:56
16.	"Vidhi Vipareetha"	Hunsur Krishnamurthy	Ghantasala, P. Leela	4:57
17.	"Shraddhadoota Summane"	Hunsur Krishnamurthy	B. Gopalam, chorus	3:03
18.	"Bhuviyalli Munigalu"	Hunsur Krishnamurthy	P. Leela	1:01
19.	"Adigo Adithya"	Hunsur Krishnamurthy	Ghantasala	0:38
20.	"Deena Baandhava"	Hunsur Krishnamurthy	P. Leela, Ghantasala	2:16

== Colourisation ==
Satya Harishchandra was the third Indian film and the first South Indian black-and-white film to be digitally coloured, following the Hindi language films Mughal-e-Azam and Naya Daur. Film producer and distributor K. C. N. Gowda of M/s KCN Enterprises collaborated with Goldstone Technologies Limited, a California based company to colour the film digitally. C. Jaganmohan, the media division business head of Goldstone Technologies, stated that each frame in the film was converted to colour.

The conversion process involved transferring the original 35 mm film to 16 mm film with colour in CinemaScope and DTS sound system. The colourising work was carried out by a team of close to 175 personnel in Hyderabad, while the sound effects, including dialogue, background music, and the musical track in the DTS system, were completed in Chennai. The entire soundtrack of the film was digitally restored by music composer, Rajesh Ramanath. The total cost of the project amounted to ₹3 crore.

== Re-releases ==
Before the release of its digitally coloured version,Satya Harishchandra had been released several times across the state of Karnataka. The digitally coloured version was re-released for the first time on 24 April 2008, to coincide with the birthday of Rajkumar. It was screened in 35 theatres across the state. Like its previous releases, the film completed a 100-day run.
