= Kadan Vaangi Kalyaanam =

1958 film by L. V. Prasad

- Poster
- Directed by: L. V. Prasad
- Story by: Chakrapani; L. V. Prasad; V. Sadasivabrahmam
- Produced by: Nagi Reddi; Chakrapani
- Starring: R. Ganesh; Savithri; Jamuna
- Cinematography: Marcus Bartley
- Edited by: G. Kalyanasundaram; K. Radhakrishna Moorthy
- Music by: S. Rajeswara Rao
- Production company: Vijaya Productions
- Release date: 17 September 1958
- Country: India
- Language: Tamil

Kadan Vaangi Kalyaanam (transl. Credit-funded Marriage) is a 1958 Indian Tamil-language satirical comedy film directed by L. V. Prasad. The film stars R. Ganesh, Savithri and Jamuna. It was released on 17 September 1958. The film simultaneously shot in Telugu as Appu Chesi Pappu Koodu, which was released the following year.

== Plot ==
Rao Bahadur Thirumalingam Pillai borrows from all and sundry, and spends relentlessly. Zamindar Karunakaram Pillai is an innocent simpleton, and a good man. He is on the quest for the perfect match for his granddaughter Manjula. Thirumalingam Pillai wants his London-returned son, Dr. Thiyagarajan to marry Manjula and take all of Karunakaram Pillai's assets. Thiyagarajan is married to Leela, who is pretending to be a maid-servant and works in Thiyagarajan's home. Manjula is in love with Nagarajan, Leela's brother, who reciprocates and is jailed for being a revolutionary and a part of the independence struggle. Nagarajan is released from jail, and to set the affairs straight and teach Thirumalingam Pillai a lesson, he pretends to be a big-time Zamindar and stays in Karunakaram Pillai's home, who now wants Nagarajan to marry Manjula. Thiyagarajan gets involved in the drama without anyone's invite or knowledge, thus producing situational humor by posing as a prospective groom for Manjula and flirting with his maid/wife much to his father's horror. Confusion and comedy follow, while in the end Thirumalingam Pillai learns his lesson and all the pairs are united.

== Cast ==
Male cast

- R. Ganesh as Nagarajan
- T. S. Balaiah as Dharmalingam Pillai
- K. A. Thangavelu as Namasivayam
- T. R. Ramachandran as Thiyagarajan
- S. V. Ranga Rao as Karunakaram Pillai
- K. Sarangapani as Chokkalingam
- A. Karunanidhi-Pakkirisami as Theatre crew
- R. Nageshwara Rao as Wrestler Bheeman
- V. M. Ezhumalai as Subbaiah
- Sattam Pillai Venkatraman as Chettiar
- L. Narayana Rao as Mistress' father
- Vathiraj as Kittu

Female cast

- Savithri as Manjula
- Jamuna as Leela
- E. V. Saroja as Usha
- T. P. Muthulakshmi as Visalam

Gevacolor dance

- E. V. Saroja

== Soundtrack ==
The music was composed by S. Rajeswara Rao, while the lyrics were written by Thanjai N. Ramaiah Dass.

Song	Singers	Length
"Kaiyum Kaiyum Kalandhuidavaa Jaaliyaagave"	A. M. Rajah & P. Leela	02:39
"Kadan Vaangi Kalyaana Saadham"	Seerkazhi Govindarajan	02:47
"Engirundhu Veesudho Inidhaagave Thendral"	A. M. Rajah & P. Leela	02:27
"Kaasikku Ponene Raamaahari"	S. C. Krishnan & A. G. Rathnamala	03:16
"Raama Raama Saranam Pattaabi Raama Saranam"	P. Leela	02:14
"Sundaraangiyai Paartthadhinaale Sila Per"	P. Leela, Seerkazhi Govindarajan & A. M. Rajah	03:44
"Podhum Undhan Jaalame"	A. M. Rajah	02:50
"Madhu Vendum.... Kalamilaadha Kaalatthile"	P. Leela & P. Suseela	03:18
"Neerilaa Kinattrinile Verilaa Vaazhaiyundu"	A. M. Rajah	02:00
"Akkaa Magale....Thootthukkudi Saatthukkudi"	S. C. Krishnan & A. G. Rathnamala	02:50
"Aanandham Paramaanandham Aanandham Paramaanandham"	A. M. Rajah & P. Leela	02:30
"Thennaadu Mudhal Enaadu Varai"	Seerkazhi Govindarajan	01:01
"Than Manadhai Nalanukku"	P. Leela, Seerkazhi Govindarajan & A. M. Rajah	06:26
"Thaaraavin Paarvaiyile O Vennilaave"	A. M. Rajah	02:14

== Reception ==
Kanthan of Kalki called it a film worth watching if one wanted to laugh, not cry.
