= Bhagya Chakramu =

1968 film directed by K. V. Reddy

- Theatrical release poster
- Directed by: K. V. Reddy
- Screenplay by: K. V. Reddy
- Story by: Pingali Nagendra Rao
- Produced by: P. S. Reddy
- Starring: N. T. Rama Rao; B. Saroja Devi
- Cinematography: Kamal Ghosh; K. S. Prasad
- Edited by: Vasu
- Music by: Pendyala Nageswara Rao
- Production company: Jayanthi Pictures
- Release date: 13 September 1968
- Running time: 187 minutes
- Country: India
- Language: Telugu

Bhagya Chakramu (transl. The wheel of fortune) is a 1968 Telugu-language film, directed by K. V. Reddy, and produced by P. S. Reddy under the Jayanthi Pictures banner. It stars N. T. Rama Rao, B. Saroja Devi and music composed by Pendyala Nageswara Rao.

== Cast ==
- N. T. Rama Rao as Vikram
- B. Saroja Devi as Papa
- Rajanala as Swamy Raja
- Padmanabham as Mitralabham
- Mukkamala as Gandragoli
- Mudigonda Lingamurthy as Dharmapala Maharaju
- Chalam
- Peketi Sivaram
- P. J. Sarma
- Jagga Rao
- Geetanjali as Chitravathi
- Surabhi Balasaraswathi as Nagamma
- Rushyendramani
- Jyothi Lakshmi

== Soundtrack ==
Music composed by Pendyala Nageswara Rao. Lyrics were written by Pingali Nagendra Rao.

S. No.	Song title	Singers	length
1	"Neetholi Vegalenu"	L. R. Eswari	3:54
2	"Vaana Kaadu Vaana Kaadu"	P. Susheela	3:23
3	"Neevuleka Nimusamaina"	Ghantasala, P. Susheela	3:15
4	"Kunda Kaadu Kundakaadu"	Ghantasala	2:49
5	"Aasa Nirasanu Chesithiva"	Ghantasala	3:21
6	"Rajakumari"	Pithapuram, Swarnalatha	2:42
7	"Manaswamy Naamam"	Pithapuram, Madhavapeddi Satyam	2:01
8	"Thaalaleni Thaapamaaye"	P. Susheela	2:47
