= C. I. D. (1965 film) =

- Theatrical release poster
- Directed by: Tapi Chanakya
- Written by: D. V. Narasa Raju (dialogues)
- Screenplay by: Chakrapani
- Story by: K.Balachander
- Based on: Dheiva Thaai (Tamil)
- Produced by: Chakrapani; Nagi Reddy
- Starring: N. T. Rama Rao; Jamuna
- Cinematography: Madhav Bulbule
- Edited by: G. Kalyana Sunder; D. G. Jayaram
- Music by: Ghantasala
- Production company: Vijaya Productions
- Release date: 23 September 1965
- Running time: 172 minutes
- Country: India
- Language: Telugu

C. I. D. is a 1965 Indian Telugu-language action film, produced by Nagireddy-Chakrapani under the Vijaya Productions banner and directed by Tapi Chanakya. The film stars N. T. Rama Rao and Jamuna, with the music composed by Ghantasala. The film is a remake of the Tamil movie Dheiva Thaai (1964).

== Cast ==
- N. T. Rama Rao as Ravi
- Jamuna as Vasantha
- Gummadi as Chalapathi / Baba
- Rajanala as Udandam
- Mikkilineni as S. P. Ramadasu
- Ramana Reddy as Vyaghreswara Bhagavatar
- Pandari Bai as Parvathi
- Hemalatha as Avva
- Meena Kumari as Chenchela

== Soundtrack ==
C.I.D

Film score by Ghantasala
- Released: 1965
- Genre: Soundtrack
- Length: 24:31
- Producer: Ghantasala

Music composed by Ghantasala. Lyrics were written by Pingali Nagendra Rao.

S. No.	Song title	Singers	length
1	"Ninu Kalisina Nimushamuna"	P. Susheela	2:53
2	"Yuvathulu Choosi Choodakamunde"	P. Susheela	3:25
3	"Yendukayyaa Vunchinaavu"	Ghantasala	4:21
4	"Yendukano Ninu Choodagane"	Ghantasala, P. Susheela	3:30
5	"Naasari Neevani"	Ghantasala, P. Susheela	3:14
6	"Jagamu Cheekatayene"	P. Susheela	3:11
7	"Naa Manasu Nee Manasu"	Ghantasala, P. Susheela	3:02
8	"Yevedhi Etluchese"	Ghantasala	0:55

== Bibliography ==
- Rajadhyaksha, Ashish; Willemen, Paul (1998) [1994]. Encyclopaedia of Indian Cinema (PDF). British Film Institute and Oxford University Press. ISBN 0-19-563579-5.
