= Mayabazar (1936 film) =

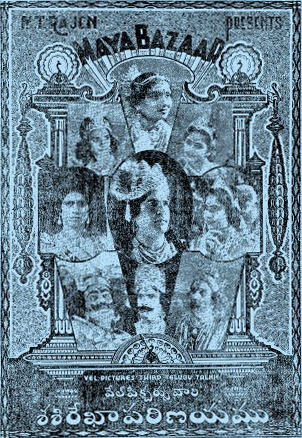
- Poster
- Directed by: P. V. Das
- Based on: Sasirekha Parinayam
- Starring: Yadavalli Nageswara Rao; S.P. Lakshmana Swamy; Rami Reddy; Santhakumari
- Music by: Galipenchala Narasimha Rao
- Production company: Vel Pictures
- Release date: 1936
- Country: India
- Language: Telugu

Mayabazar (also known as Sasirekha Parinayam) is a 1936 Indian Telugu-language fantasy film directed by P. V. Das and produced by Vel Pictures. The film stars Yadavalli Nageswara Rao, S. P. Lakshmana Swamy, Rami Reddy, and Santhakumari. Music was composed by Galipenchala Narasimha Rao.

The story is an adaptation of the folk tale Sasirekha Parinayam, which in turn is based on the epic Mahabharata. The film was a huge hit. P. V. Das died before the release of the film.

== Cast ==
As per The Hindu article:

- Yadavalli Nageswara Rao as Krishna
- S. P. Lakshmana Swamy as Abhimanyu
- Rami Reddy as Ghatotkacha
- Santhakumari as Sasirekha

== Production ==
Das chose stage actor Yadavalli Nageswara Rao to portray Lord Krishna. Master Saluri Rajeswara Rao who was introduced in Srikrishna Leelalu (1935) portrayed the younger version of Abhimanyu while S. P. Lakshmanaswamy portrayed the elder version. Rayapralu Subrahmanyam and Rami Reddy were selected to portray Duryodhana and Ghatothkacha respectively.

While searching for the actress to portray the role of Sasirekha, P. V. Das found Subbamma at a school teaching music. Though her parents was initially against her decision to enter acting, they later relented. Subbamma was rechristened as Santhakumari.

== Soundtrack ==
The song "Vivaha Bhojanambu" which became popular in the 1957 version of Mayabazar, was previously composed for this film. It was said to be there in the 1932 Hindi Mayabazaar too. That tune was inspired by Charles Penrose's 1922 song "The Laughing Policeman", written by Penrose under the pseudonym of Charles Jolly.
