= Satya Harishchandra (1965 Telugu film) =

- Theatrical release poster
- Directed by: K. V. Reddy
- Written by: Pingali Nagendra Rao (story / dialogues)
- Screenplay by: K. V. Reddy
- Based on: Life of Harishchandra
- Produced by: K. V. Reddy
- Starring: N. T. Rama Rao; S. Varalakshmi
- Cinematography: Kamal Ghosh
- Edited by: G. Kalyana Sunder; D. G. Jayaram
- Music by: Pendyala Nageswara Rao
- Production company: Vijaya Productions
- Release date: 22 April 1965
- Running time: 162 mins
- Country: India
- Language: Telugu

Satya Harishchandra is a 1965 Indian Telugu-language Hindu mythological film, based on the life of Harishchandra, produced and directed by K. V. Reddy under the Vijaya Productions banner. It stars N. T. Rama Rao and S. Varalakshmi, with music composed by Pendyala Nageswara Rao.

The film released on 22 April 1965 and was not successful at the box-office. K. V. Reddy produced the film simultaneously in Kannada with the same title, starring Dr Rajkumar.

== Cast ==
- N. T. Rama Rao as Harishchandra
- S. Varalakshmi as Chandramathi
- V. Nagayya as Maharshi Vasishta
- Mukkamala as Brahmarshi Viswamitra
- Rajanala as Veerabahudu
- Relangi as Kalakousikudu
- Ramana Reddy as Nakshatrakudu
- Mikkilineni as Indra
- Prabhakar Reddy as Lord Siva
- Chadalavada as Auctioneer
- Raja Babu as Kalakousikudu's disciple
- Balakrishna as Kalakousikudu's disciple
- Nalla Ramamurthy as Kalakousikudu's disciple
- Ramakoti as Kalakousikudu's disciple
- A. V. Subbarao Jr. as Satyakeerthi
- Girija as Kalahakanthi
- L. Vijayalakshmi as Menaka
- Vanisri as Matangi
- Rajasree as Matanga Kanya
- Meena Kumari as Matanga Kanya
- Mohana as Queen of Kasi
- Sabita Devi as Goddess Parvathi
- Master Babu as Lohitasyudu

== Production ==
After the success of Sri Krishnarjuna Yuddhamu (1963) based on popular mythological play Gayopakhyanam, K. V. Reddy planned a film based on another mythological play Satya Harishchandra for Vijaya Productions. The songs and poems written by Balijepalli Lakshmikantha Kavi for his magnum opus play Satya Harischandriyamu in 1924 were already popular with the audience. However, due to copyright issues, K. V. Reddy could not use those poems. Pingali wrote new poems and songs for the film. K. V. Reddy also produced the film for Vijaya Productions. The film titled Satya Harishchandra starred N. T. Rama Rao in the title role and S. Varalakshmi as Chandramathi. The film released on 22 April 1965 and was a failure at the box-office. Audience accustomed to the old poems of Lakshmikantha Kavi were disappointed with the new ones and this was attributed as one of the reasons for the failure of the film.

== Music ==
Satya Harishchandra

Film score by Pendyala Nageswara Rao
- Released: 1965
- Genre: Soundtrack
- Label: EMI Columbia
- Producer: Pendyala Nageswara Rao

Pendyala Nageswara Rao chronology
Sabhash Suri (1964)	Satya Harishchandra (1965)	Prameelarjuneeyam (1965)

Music was composed by Pendyala Nageswara Rao. Lyrics were written by Pingali Nagendra Rao. Music released by EMI Columbia Audio Company.

S. No.	Song title	Singers	length
1	"Vande Suraanaam"	Ghantasala	1:06
2	"Neevu Maku Chikkinavule"	P. Susheela, Swarnalatha	2:53
3	"Vamsamunu"	Ghantasala	0:21
4	"Andalatanaya"	S. Varalakshmi	2:29
5	"Naanaa Deva Dhanambunu"	Ghantasala	0:43
6	"Eeswara Jagadheeshwara"	Ghantasala	4:05
7	"Namo Bhootanatha"	Ghantasala, S. Varalakshmi	2:57
8	"Kulamulo Yemundira"	Madhavapeddi Satyam	3:17
9	"Taranadhim"	Swarnalatha	3:04
10	"Chathuraashantha"	Ghantasala	0:34
11	"Vidhi Vipareetham"	Ghantasala, P. Leela	5:36
12	"Aadaneevu Eedaneevu"	Swarnalatha	3:06
13	"Thadina Bhojanam"	P. Susheela, B. Gopalam	2:45
14	"Adhigo"	Ghantasala	0:30
15	"Kalalonanaina"	Ghantasala	1:27
16	"Thaali Kattina"	Ghantasala	1:11

== Bibliography ==
- U. Vinayaka Rao (2012), Telugu Cine Rangam - Pouranika Chitralu, Hyderabad: Telugu Academy
