= Pellinaati Pramanalu =

1958 film directed by Kadiri Venkata Reddy

- Theatrical release poster
- Directed by: K. V. Reddy
- Screenplay by: K. V. Reddy
- Story by: Pingali
- Produced by: K. V. Reddy
- Starring: Akkineni Nageswara Rao; Jamuna
- Cinematography: K. S. Prasad
- Edited by: M. S. Mani
- Music by: Ghantasala
- Production company: Jayanthi Pictures
- Release date: 17 December 1958
- Running time: 172 minutes
- Country: India
- Language: Telugu

Pellinaati Pramanalu (transl. Wedding vows) is a 1958 Indian Telugu-language comedy drama film, produced and directed by K. V. Reddy. It stars Akkineni Nageswara Rao and Jamuna, with music composed by Ghantasala. The film was simultaneously made in Tamil as Vaazhkai Oppandham with a slightly different cast that released the following year.

The Telugu version was released on 12 December 1958 and the Tamil film on 4 September 1959. The Telugu version had an above-average run at the box office while the Tamil film fared averagely but recovered its money through pre-selling. At the 6th National Film Awards, Pellinaati Pramanalu won the Best Feature Film in Telugu award.

== Cast ==
- Akkineni Nageswara Rao as Krishna Rao
- Jamuna as Rukmini
- S. V. Ranga Rao as Rao Bahadur Bheemasena Rao
- Rajasulochana as Radha Devi
- R. Nageswara Rao as Pratap
- Ramana Reddy as Salahala Rao
- Chhaya Devi as Salahala Rao's wife Anuradhamma
- Dr. Sivaramakrishnayya as R. P. Nanda
- Peketi Sivaram as M. V. Hal
- Allu Ramalingaiah as Prakatanalu
- Chadalavada as Ammakalu
- Balakrishna as Office Peon
- Surabhi Kamalabai as Yerukala Subbi

== Production ==
K. V. Reddy liked the American film The Seven Year Itch (1955) and its story idea and wanted to make a film on the same theme. Earlier, K. V. Reddy wanted to make this film for Annapurna Pictures' maiden production but was vetoed by producer Dukkipati Madhusudana Rao despite the fact that both K. V. Reddy and the lead actor Akkineni Nageswara Rao liked the idea. Madhusudana Rao felt that the audience may not accept their favourite hero to be shown as the father of three children in most parts of the movie and cheat his wife.

After the phenomenal success of both Donga Ramudu (1955) and Mayabazar (1957), K. V. Reddy decided to venture into film production and formed Jayanthi Pictures, with fellow alumni at the Presidency College, Madras — P. S. Reddy and T. Pattabhirama Reddy. He chose this idea for Jayanthi Pictures' first project. K. V. Reddy entrusted the job of adapting it to Telugu setting to Pingali Nagendra Rao. Pingali took only the central point of "marital wanderlust" from the Hollywood film and came up with an entirely new story and characters.

Titled Pellinaati Pramanalu, the film starred Akkineni Nageswara Rao and Jamuna. The film was simultaneously made in Tamil as Vaazhkai Oppandham with a slightly different cast that released the following year.

== Release and reception ==
The Telugu version was released on 12 December 1958 and the Tamil film on 4 September 1959. The Telugu version had an above-average run at the box office while the Tamil film fared averagely but recovered its money through pre-selling.

== Soundtrack ==
Music was composed by Ghantasala. Lyrics were written by Pingali.

| Song title | Singers | length |
|---|---|---|
| "Brundavana Chandamama Endukoyi Tagavu" | Ghantasala, P. Leela | 2:35 |
| "Challaga Choodali Poolanu Andukupovali Devi" | Ghantasala | 2:31 |
| "Neetone Lokamu Neetone Swargamu" | Ghantasala, P. Leela | 3:02 |
| "Edo Teliyaka Pilichitinoyi" | P. Susheela | 3:21 |
| "Vennelalone Vedi" | Ghantasala, P. Leela | 2:28 |
| "Arana Ana Aina" | Jikki | 2:44 |
| "Raave Muddula Radha" | Ghantasala, P. Susheela | 2:55 |
| "Sreemanturalivai Cheluvondu" | P. Leela | 3:10 |
| "Sura Yaksha Gandharva" | Ghantasala | 3:03 |
| "Laali Maa Papayi Ananda Laali" | P. Leela | 3:03 |

== Accolades ==
At the 6th National Film Awards, Pellinaati Pramanalu won the award for Best Feature Film in Telugu.
