= Srikakula Andhra Maha Vishnu Katha =

- Theatrical release poster
- Directed by: A. K. Sekhar
- Screenplay by: D. Chowdary
- Story by: Pingali Nagendra Rao
- Based on: Life of Andhra Vishnu
- Produced by: Daggubati Lakshminarayana Chowdary
- Starring: N. T. Rama Rao; Jamuna
- Cinematography: U. Rajgopal
- Edited by: M. S. Mani; K. Satyam
- Music by: Pendyala Nageswara Rao
- Production company: Sri Sambhu Films
- Release date: 6 May 1966
- Running time: 154 mins
- Country: India
- Language: Telugu

Srikakula Andhra Maha Vishnu Katha is a 1966 Indian Telugu-language historical drama film, based on the life of Andhra Vishnu, produced by Daggubati Lakshminarayana Chowdary under the Sri Sambhu Films banner and directed by A. K. Sekhar. It stars N. T. Rama Rao and Jamuna, with music composed by Pendyala Nageswara Rao.

== Plot ==
During the time of a historical era at Srikakulam, its emperor Suchandra bestows his kingdom to the Lord Vishnu to unite all the Telugu kingdoms under a reign, evade internal collisions, and establish peace. Moreover, an acting answer to the barbarities of adjacent realms, Emperor Naganishinbha, a man of towering strength, seeks to suppress the Andhrulu. Indeed, his malevolent Chief Minister Mahendrajit snares him delusion governing iniquity. Vallabha Deva, the prince of Srikakulam, is an ultimate warrior and coequal to Nishinbha. He tours the country, hinders Mahendrajit's wild forces, and constructs a civilian army. Fortuitously, he encounters & crushes with Nishinbha's daughter, Sujatha, without bringing himself to light. Parallelly, Mahendra forges his idiotic sibling Satrajit as a prince and ruses to knit him with Sujatha. Vallabha assigns an ambassador to summon Nishinbha for a duel without bloodshed, but Mahendrajit imprisons him. Vallabha disguises himself, lands at Nishinbha's kingdom, arouses a spunk in public to retribute the deformity, and keeps up with his love affair. Once, he directly contacts Nishinbha by intentionally surrendering and roaring against him. At this, Nishinbha is astonished by his brawniness and announces him as his son-in-law, being his tantamount and unbeknownst to his identity. Mahendrajit subterfuges to assassinate him, but he absconded. Plus, he tries to toxin Nishinbha by admitting the one is Vallabha came with a plot. Besides, Vallabha gazes at Nishinbha's nescience and wants to enlighten him. Hereupon, Nishinbha ascertains the fact from Sujatha's guidance by stepping into town in the guise. Ergo heralds Sujatha's splice with Vallabha and invites Suchandra. Enraged, Mahendrajit seizes the royal family by sedating Nishinbha, and he wiles to wedlock Sujatha. At last, Vallabha secures all and ceases the baddies when Nishinbha reforms and bows down before their Lord. Finally, the movie ends happily, with the marriage of Vallabha Deva & Sujatha.

== Cast ==
- N. T. Rama Rao as Vallabha Deva
- Jamuna as Sujatha
- S. V. Ranga Rao as Naganishinbha
- Relangi as Sarvajett
- Mudigonda Lingamurthy as Mahendrajit
- Mikkilineni as Arjunadeva
- M. Balaiah as Baladeva
- Chadalavada as Bhilla
- Potti Prasad as Kireeti
- Jaggu Rao as Chanda
- Girija as Makarika
- Chaya Devi as Naganishinbha's wife
- L. Vijayalakshmi as Aruna
- Suryakala as Radha

== Soundtrack ==
Srikakula Andhra Maha Vishnu Katha

Film score by Pendyala Nageswara Rao
- Released: 1966
- Genre: Soundtrack
- Length: 30:41
- Producer: Pendyala Nageswara Rao

Music composed by Pendyala Nageswara Rao. Lyrics were written by Pingali Nagendra Rao. The song "Vasantha Galiki" is based on Valaji raga.

S. No.	Song title	Singers	length
1	"Jayahe Jayahe"	P. Leela	2:28
2	"Kusalama Echanuntivo"	Ghantasala, S. Janaki	4:28
3	"Mohana Ramanuda"	Madhavapeddi Satyam, Vasantha	2:11
4	"Ne Raanantina Oo Mavaiah"	S. Janaki	3:32
5	"Ohiri Saahiri"	S. Janaki, Swarnalatha, Vasantha	3:11
6	"Kusalamaa Kusalamaa"	Ghantasala, S. Janaki	4:11
7	"Oo Sumabaana"	Swarnalatha, Vasantha	4:00
8	"Vallabhaa Priya Vallabha"	S. Janaki	3:01
9	"Vasanta Gaaliki Valapulu Rega"	M. Balamuralikrishna, S. Janaki	3:39
