= Bhakta Pothana =

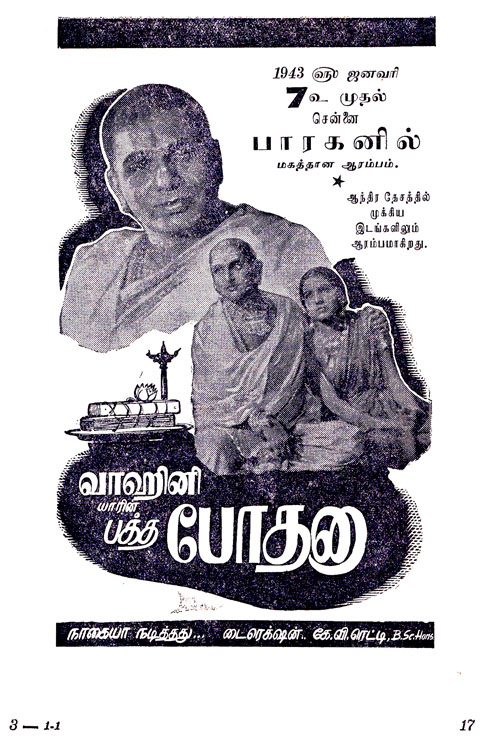
- Poster
- Directed by: K. V. Reddy
- Story by: Ramnoth
- Dialogue by: Samudrala Sr.
- Produced by: B. N. Reddy (Production Supervision); Moola Narayana Swamy (Presenter)
- Starring: V. Nagayya
- Cinematography: K. Ramnoth
- Music by: V. Nagayya
- Production company: Vauhini Studios
- Release date: 7 January 1943
- Running time: 186 minutes
- Language: Telugu

Bhakta Pothana is a 1943 Telugu-language biographical film directed by K. V. Reddy in his directorial debut. Based on the life of poet-saint Pothana who translated Bhagavatham into Telugu language, the film was scripted by Samudrala Sr. The film had celebrated Jubilee runs all over South India including Mysore state and Kerala. It was remade in 1966, starring V. Nagayya as Vedavyasa in a minor role, while he portrayed the lead character Pothana in the 1943 movie.

== Plot ==
Bammera Pothana is a staunch devotee of Lord Rama. He lived a pious life with his wife Narasamamba, son Mallanna and daughter Lakshmi in Ekasilapuram. Lord Rama appears before him and orders him to translate Bhagavatam into Telugu language. Sarada daughter of his brother-in-law Srinatha lived with his family after death of her mother. King Sarvagna Singabhoopala sends Srinatha to convince Pothana to dedicate the Bhagavatam to him. Pothana refused the request and dedicated his work to Lord Rama. The King attempts to forcibly take it and exile him from his kingdom. His intentions were nullified by divine intervention. The King realizes his mistake and welcomes back Pothana and his family to the Kingdom and provides for them to lead a respectable life.

== Cast ==
Actor/Actress	Character
V. Nagayya	Pothana
Mudigonda Lingamurthy	Ajamila, the rowdy
Hemalatha Devi	Narasamamba, Pothana's wife
Vanaja Naalam	Lakshmi, Pothana's daughter
C. H. Narayana Rao	Lord Rama
Tanguturi Suryakumari	Goddess Saraswathi (cameo role)
Bezawada Rajarathnam	
Sivaram Vallabhajosyula	Mallanna, Pothana's son
Jandhyala Gowrinatha Sastry	Sreenatha
Malathi K.	Sreenatha's daughter
Dr. V. R. Sarma	King Sarvagna Singabhoopala
Samrajyam	Court Dancer

== Crew ==
- Director : K. V. Reddy
- Dialogues and Songs: Samudrala Sr.
- Producers : Moola Narayana Swamy and B.N. Reddi
- Original Music : V. Nagayya
- Cinematography : K. Ramnoth
- Art Direction : A.K. Sekhar
- Production Management : Mudigonda Lingamurthy
- Assistant Director : Kamalakara Kameswara Rao
- Playback Singers : Malathi, V. Nagayya, Vanaja N., Bezawada Rajarathnam and Sivaram V.

== Soundtrack ==
There are about 20 songs and poems in Bhakta Pothana. Lyrics were written by Samudrala Sr.

1. Aataladadu Vadina Maataladadu (Singer: Nalam Vanaja)
2. Baala Rasaala Saala Nava Pallava (Singer: V. Sivaram)
3. Idi Manchi Samayamu Raara (Singer: Bezawada Rajaratnam)
4. Evvani Chejaninchu (Pothana poem)
5. Immanujeswaraadhamulaki Kujambulu (Pothana poem)
6. Kamaneeya Bhoomi Bhaagamulu Lekunnave (Pothana poem)
7. Katuka Kantineeru (Pothana poem) (Singer: Nagayya)
8. Maa Vadina Maa Vadina Sukumari (Singers: Malathi and Nalam Vanaja)
9. Mandara Makaranda Maadhuryamunadelu (Pothana poem) (Singer: Nalam Vanaja)
10. Mata Pita Gurudevahita (Singers: Bezawada Rajaratnam and Nagayya)
11. Nammitinamma Seetamma (Singer: Hemalatha Devi)
12. Nannu Vidichi Kadalakura Ramayya (Singer: Nagayya)
13. Nanu Paalimpaga Chanudenchitiva (Singers: Nagayya and Nalam Vanaja)
14. Paavana Guna Ramahare (Singer: Nagayya)
15. Raa Poorna Chandrika (Singer: Nalam Vanaja)
16. Rama Rama Seetarama (Singers: Nagayya and Nalam Vanaja)
17. Sarva Dharman Parityajya (Singers: Nagaigh group)
18. Sarva Mangala Naama Seetarama Rama (Singers: Nagaigh group)
