= Vemana =

Telugu poet

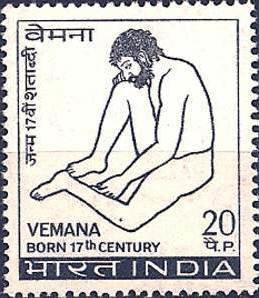
- Vemana on a postal stamp
- Born: c. 1652; Kadapa, Andhra Pradesh, India
- Died: Katarupalli Village near Kadiri Anantapur District of Andhra Pradesh
- Occupations: Achala Yogi, Poet, Social Reformer
- Writing career
- Notable work: vemana satakam

Vemana (born Vema Reddi), popularly known as Yogi Vemana, was an Indian philosopher and poet in the Telugu language. His poems are known for their simple language and the use of native idioms. They discuss the subjects of yoga, wisdom and morality.

== Early life and background ==
There is no consensus among scholars about the period in which Vemana lived. C.P. Brown, known for his research on Vemana, estimates his year of birth to be 1652 based on some of his verses. According to differing sources, he was said to have been born in the 15th, 16th, 17th or 18th century. Vemana was a Vedic scholar and a yogi in achala sidhantha.

Vemana was born in Gandikota, Kadapa district in Andhra Pradesh.

== Death ==
There is a headstone marking the grave of Yogi Vemana in Katarupalli (Kadiri town), a village in Kadiri taluk, Anantapur district, Andhra Pradesh. It is widely believed that Vemana died in this village. As he was a yogi, he was buried and not cremated.

== Poetic style ==
Many lines of Yogi Vemana's poems are now colloquial phrases of the Telugu language. They end with the signature line Viswadaabhi Raama Vinura Vema, literally "Beloved of Viswada, listen Vema." There are multiple interpretations of what the last line signifies.

Vemana's poems were collected and published by Brown in the 19th century. His poems follow various themes: social, moral, satirical and mystical. Most of them are in Ataveladi (dancing lady) meter.

== Films ==
- Yogi Vemana, a 1947 Telugu film directed by K. V. Reddy, starring V. Nagayya.
- Sri Vemana Charitra, another Telugu film, released in 1986 and directed by C. S. Rao, starring Vijayachander.
