= Sasirekha Parinayam =

Telugu folktale

Sasirekha Parinayam is an Indian Telugu folktale based on oral traditions popular in Telugu States. While it uses characters who appear in the Mahabharata, the story is not present in the epic. The plot concerns the marriage of Sasirekha, called Vatsala in some versions, the daughter of Balarama, to Abhimanyu, the son of Arjuna. It echoes the marriage of Arjuna to Subhadra in the Mahabharata.

The story is popular in performances, including Tholu bommalata (shadow puppets), Yakshagana, and Kuchipudi. By early 1950s, Surabhi theatre troupes made the folktale popular across Telugu-speaking regions.

== Plot ==
Sasirekha, the daughter of Balarama and Revathi, shared a deep bond with her childhood friend, Abhimanyu. Keeping in mind Sasirekha and Abhimanyu’s mutual fondness, at a very young age, Subhadra asked her hand in marriage for her son Abhimanyu. This offer was cordially accepted by Balarama and his wife. But very soon Abhimanyu and Sasirekha had to part ways, due to better educational prospects for Abhimanyu in Dwarka. As a result, they spent their teenage separated. It was during this period that the cursed Pācikalu (Game of Dice) took place. The Pandavas lost their wealth, kingdom and were also forced to spend 12 years in exile. This event affected Subhadra’s life as she had to relinquish her expensive ornaments and sarees, adopting a simpler lifestyle.

Following this event, Subhadra and Abhimanyu left to Mathura for moral support but Subhadra was very disappointed to see the noticeable difference in Revathi’s behaviour. Revathi ridiculed her simple clothing behind her back while a forlorn Subhadra tried to find solace in Rukmini’s words, causing her to fear that her appearance had influenced Balarama's decision. Shakuni, saw an opportunity to strengthen the Kauravas position and advised Duryodhana to marry his son, Lakshmana Kumara, to Sasirekha. Balarama, under pressure and influenced by Revathi's disapproval, agreed to the proposal, believing it to be the best option for his daughter's future. This news came as a shock to both Subhadra and Sasirekha. Sasirekha had always dreamed of marrying Abhimanyu, and the prospect of being forced into a loveless union caused her immense pain. Heartbroken by Balarama's betrayal, Subhadra decides to leave Mathura with her son.

Subhadra and Abhimanyu, stumble upon the territory of Ghatotkacha, the formidable son of Bhima and Hidimbi, on their way. Ghatotkacha’s sidekicks inform him about the entry of a young man and his old mother in their territory. Intrigued, he sends them to scare way those mere mortals but when his sidekicks stood defeated against the mere mortals, Ghatotkacha had no option but to take matters into his own hands. Wearing the sturdiest armour and wielding the most frightening weapons, he flew off in their search. Soon a fight started between the valiant Abhimanyu and the mighty Ghatotkacha, the latter was surprised as to how the former could save himself from his fatal attacks for so long. His suspicions came true when Subhadra finally yelled out Arjuna's name and it was then Ghatotkacha was enlightened. He dropped his weapons at once and fell at Subhadra’s feet, begging her forgiveness and reveals to Abhimanyu that he was his elder brother, the son of Bhima. Abhimanyu and Subhadra rejoiced as an elated Ghatotkacha introduced them to his mother Hidimba. Abhimanyu and Subhadra narrate their sorrows to them. Determined to turn their misfortunes around, Ghatotkacha leaves to Balarama’s palace. The initial triumph of arriving unnoticed at the palace soon turned into confusion, as to kidnap Sasirekha, he had to first know her chamber. Here, Krishna in the form of an old man comes to the rescue, guiding Ghatotkacha to the right chamber. With feet as light as a feather, the giant Ghatotkacha entered Sasirekha’s chamber, lifted her bed with one hand and flew back to the Kamyaka forest. Sasirekha couldn’t suspect a thing as she was fast asleep. Abhimanyu was shocked to see Ghatotkacha arrive with Sasirekha. He questions as to what Balarama would think of them if he found out, that he had abducted his daughter but with a mischievous twinkle in his eye, Ghatotkacha says that his masterplan was not yet complete. He planned to disguise himself as Sasirekha and terrify Lakshmana Kumara, exacting revenge for the injustice done to Pandavas. And so the massive Ghatotkacha transformed himself into the delicate Sasirekha and flew off to Mathura.

The day of Sasirekha’s wedding arrived. Though everyone felt that Sasirekha aka Ghatotkacha’s behaviour was a little over the top and weird, they couldn’t raise a finger as she still looked the same. Ghatotkacha, determined to scare Lakshmana Kumara, engaged in a series of peculiar behaviors, including attempting to crush his feet, squeezing his hands, and devouring food voraciously. Despite these oddities, Lakshmana Kumara, captivated by Sasirekha's beauty and fueled by a competitive spirit, persisted in the courtship. Only Shakuni suspected foul play, but Balarama dismissed his concerns. Just before the wedding ceremony, Ghatotkacha revealed his true identity, exposing Shakuni's deception and Balarama's mistake. Balarama, initially furious, eventually acknowledged the truth and ordered Duryodhana and Shakuni to leave. It was them that Balarama then expresses his desire to marry his daughter to Abhimanyu and repent for his deeds. Ghatotkacha, overjoyed, carried Balarama and Revathi to Kamyaka, where Sasirekha and Abhimanyu were finally married, surrounded by their loved ones.

== In popular culture ==
The story was adapted to cinema multiple times. According M. L. Narasimham of The Hindu, Baburao Painter adapted the folktale thrice as a silent film in 1919, 1921 and 1923 with V. Shantaram as Lord Krishna. Nanubhai Vakil directed the first talkie version of the tale in 1932 in Hindi. R. Padmanaban made a Tamil film based on the story in 1935. P. V. Das adapted it into his 1936 Telugu film Mayabazar (also known as Sasirekha Parinayam).

The most popular film made on the folktale is the 1957 Telugu film Mayabazar. On the centenary of Indian cinema in 2013, CNN-IBN included the 1957 Mayabazar in its list of "100 greatest Indian films of all time". In an online poll conducted by CNN-IBN among those 100 films, it was voted by the public as the "greatest Indian film of all time."

The 2008 Telugu film Sasirekha Parinayam was also named after it. The story was adapted into a Hindi film titled Veer Ghatotkach in 1948 and was remade in 1970, from Ghatotkacha's perspective. It was also made into the animated film Ghatotkach in 2008.
