= Tyagayya (1946 film) =

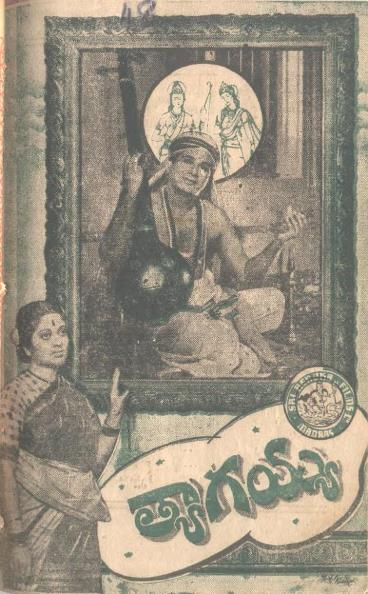
- Poster of Tyagayya
- Directed by: V. Nagayya
- Screenplay by: V. Nagayya; S. V. R. Acharya or Samudrala Sr. Dialogues and other songs
- Story by: V. Nagayya
- Based on: The life of Tyagaraja
- Produced by: Nagayya; Sri Duvvuri Narayana Reddy
- Starring: V. Nagayya; B. Jayamma
- Cinematography: Mohamed A. Rehman
- Edited by: Govind Dinkar Joshi
- Music by: V. Nagayya
- Production companies: Sri Renuka Films, Madras
- Release date: 1 November 1946 (India)
- Running time: 186 minutes
- Language: Telugu

Tyagayya is a 1946 Telugu-language film produced and directed by V. Nagayya It is based on the life of the saint Tyagaraja.

== Cast ==
Male cast

- V. Nagayya as Tyagayya
- Lingamurthy as Japesam
- Nyapathi Narayana Moorthi M. L. A., (Central) as King Sharabhoji
- Rayaprolu Subrahmanyam as Venkataramana Bhagavatulu
- K. Doraiswamy as Sundaresa Mudaliar
- M. C. Raghavan as Marthanda Bhagavatar
- Natesam as Bobbili Kesavayya
- K. V. Subba Rao as Dhanapala Chetti
- Prayaga Narasimha Sastry as Ganapati (Sishya)
- Aswatdhama as Ramudu
- Narayana Rao as Commander-in-Chief
- Vedantam Lakshmikantam as Narada-in disguise
- Kumpatla Subba Rao as Kuchipudi - Bhagavatulu
- A. L. Narayana as Kuchipudi - Bhagavatulu
- Appalacharyulu as Kuchipudi - Bhagavatulu
- G. Venkataswami Raju as Sishya

Female cast

- B. Jayamma as Dharmamba
- Sarita Devi as Chapala
- C. Hemalatha Devi as Kamalamba
- Sundaralakshmi as Seethalakshmi
- Jayavanti as Court Singer
- G. Visweswaramma as Venkamma
- Baby T. Shyamala as Radha
- Baby Vanaja as Krishna

== Production ==
The film was jointly produced by Nagayya and Sri Duvvuri Narayana Reddy, and directed by V. Nagayya. Nagayya also wrote the story. The dialogues were written by S. V. R. Acharya, popularly known as Samudrala Sr. Photography and special effects were handled by Mohamed A. Rehman. Audiography was done by Dinshaw K. Tehrani, editing by Govind Dinkar Joshi, and art by C. Rama Raju and F. Nagoor. The dances were choreographed by Vedantam Raghavayya.

== Music ==
The music was composed by V. Nagayya and the Renuka Orchestra headed by the Trivellore Violinist Brothers. While the lyrics of most of 37 songs were written by S. V. R. Acharya (Samudrala Sr.), the Tamil songs were written by Papanasam Sivan and Chandilyan. One Hindi song was written by J. A. Rehman. Nagayya had introduced lyrics in Kannada with the song Purandaradasa Devara Nama (film credits). Songs in Tamil and Hindi were sung by D. K. Pattammal and J. A. Rehman respectively.

== See also ==
- Tyagayya - 1981 film
