= R. Nageswara Rao =

Indian actor

- Born: Rajanala Nageswara Rao; 1 July 1928; Secunderabad, Hyderabad State, British India
- Died: 1959; Madras
- Occupation: Actor

Rajanala Nageswara Rao (1928–1959) was an Indian actor known for his works in Telugu cinema, and was one of the lead actors of his time. He is best known for his works in award-winning hits such as Devadasu (1953), Kanna Talli (1953), Paropakaram (1953), Raju Peda (1954), Aggi Ramudu (1954), Ilavelupu (1954), Donga Ramudu (1955), Maya Bazaar (1957), and Pelli Naati Pramanalu (1958).

== Early life ==
He was born in 1928. He has studied in the Aligarh Muslim University. He joined with the Paramount theater as a manager. He worked under the direction of P. Pullaiah in the film Sankranthi.

== Dialogues ==
He is particularly good at delivering the dialogues with punch. Some of the memorable dialogues are:

- ade debba, ade cheyyi - Appu Chesi Pappu Koodu
- babulu gadi debba ante golkonda abba - Donga Ramudu
- bhale mama bhale, ade mana takshana kartavyam - Mayabazar
- emden! - Pellinaati Pramanalu

== Filmography ==
Year	Title	Role	Language	Notes
1952	Sankranti		Telugu	
1953	Devadasu		Telugu	
1953	Chandirani		Telugu; Tamil; Hindi	
1953	Kanna Talli	Chalapathi	Telugu	
1953	Petra Thai	Chalapati	Tamil	
1953	Paropakaram		Telugu	
1954	Aggi Ramudu		Telugu	
1954	Raju Peda		Telugu	
1954	Chandraharam		Telugu	
1955	Donga Ramudu	Babulu	Telugu	
1955	Cherapakura Chedevu	Dayanidhi	Telugu	
1955	Santosham		Telugu	
1956	Jayam Manade		Telugu	
1956	Marma Veeran		Tamil	guest appearance
1957	Maya Bazaar	Dushasana	Telugu	
1957	Sankalpam	Kondalu	Telugu	
1957	Vinayaka Chaviti		Telugu	
1957	Dongallo Dora		Telugu	
1958	Bhooloka Rambha		Telugu	
1958	Raja Nandini		Telugu	
1958	Pelli Naati Pramanalu	Bheemasena Rao's son	Telugu	
1958	Mundadugu		Telugu	
1958	Anna Tammudu		Telugu	
1958	Bhuloka Ramba	Veerakesari	Telugu	
1958	Inti Guttu	Prabhakaram	Telugu	
1958	Shri Ramanjaneya Yuddham		Telugu	
1958	Kadan Vaangi Kalyaanam	Bheeman	Tamil	
1959	Appu Chesi Pappu Koodu	Ramdin	Telugu	
1959	Illarikam	Seshagiri	Telugu	
1959	Sabhash Ramudu	Bhupathi	Telugu	
1959	Pelli Sandadi		Telugu	
1960	Sri Venkateswara Mahatyam		Telugu	
1960	Makkala Rajya		Telugu	
1960	Anna Chellalu		Telugu	
1960	Bhakta Shabari		Telugu	
1960	Jagannatakam		Telugu	
1960	Pillalu Techina Challani Rajyam		Telugu	
1966	Paramanandayya Shishyula Katha		Telugu	(final film role)

== Death ==
He died of tuberculosis at the age of 31 on 5 August 1959. Sabhash Ramudu was his last major release. He finished the work on other unreleased films Bhaktha Sabari and Jagannatakam before his untimely death.
