= Pingali (writer) =

Indian writer

- Born: Pingali Nagendra Rao; 29 December 1901; Rajam, Madras Presidency, British India
- Died: 6 May 1971 (aged 69)
- Citizenship: India
- Education: National College, Machilipatnam
- Writing career
- Genres: Playwright, poet, lyricist, story writer

Pingali Nagendra Rao (29 December 1901 – 6 May 1971), known mononymously by his surname Pingali, was an Indian screenwriter, lyricist, and playwright who worked in Telugu cinema and Telugu theatre. Famous for his witty and romantic lyrics, he also wrote dialogues for many films. Pathala Bhairavi (1951), Missamma (1955), and Mayabazar (1957) are some of his best known works for story, script and song lyrics. Pingali is famous for his coining of new and funny words and phrases in Telugu such as Dhimbaka, Dingari, and Gimbali.

== Life sketch ==
He was born into a Telugu Brahmin family on 29 December 1901 to Gopalakrishnayya and Mahalaxmamma in Rajam, near Bobbili, Andhra Pradesh. Because most of his relatives are settled in Machilipatnam, their family migrated there. He did a course in Mechanical Engineering from the Andhra Jateeya Kalasala, Machilipatnam.

He joined Indian independence movement and wrote Janma Bhoomi as his first literary work. He was arrested for the same. He worked as a teacher for some time and later joined Bengal Nagpur Railway at Kharagpur for two years. He was union leader of the labour association there. During this period, he translated Dwijendralal Ray's Mebar Patan (1922) as Mevadu Rajyapatanam and Pashani (1923) from Bengali into Telugu language. His independent work during the same time was Jebunnisa. All the three dramas were published in Krishna Patrika. He joined Indian National Congress and as pracharak toured the entire country and reached Sabarmati Ashram.

He came back to Machilipatnam and joined Indian Dramatic Company of Devarakonda Venkata Subbarao in 1924 as writer and secretary. He wrote Vindyarani play in 1928 based on the Dubois of Padua of Oscar Wilde, Naa Raju play based on the history of Sri Krishnadevaraya, Maro Prapancham social play and Rani Samyukta historical play.

Pingali was considered a magician with words. He died on 6 May 1971.

All of Pingali's plays were reprinted recently in a book titled Pingaleeyam.

== Filmography ==
1. Chanakya Chandragupta (1977) (dialogues)
2. Neeti-Nijayiti (1972) (dialogues)
3. Uma Chandi Gowri Sankarula Katha (1968) (lyrics)
4. Bhagya Chakramu (1968) (lyrics)
5. C. I. D. (1965)
6. Srikakula Andhra Maha Vishnu Katha (lyrics)
7. Satya Harischandra (1965) (lyrics)
8. Prameelarjuneeyam (1965) (lyrics)
9. Sri Krishnarjuna Yudham (1963) (adaptation)
10. Mahamantri Timmarusu (1962) (story, dialogues and lyrics)
11. Gundamma Katha (1962) (screen adaptation)
12. Jagadeka Veeruni Katha (1961)
13. Mahakavi Kalidasu (Telugu, 1960) (story, dialogues and screenplay)
14. Appu Chesi Pappu Koodu (Telugu, 1959) (lyrics)
15. Pelli Naati Pramanalu (1958) (story, dialogues and lyrics)
16. Maya Bazaar (Telugu, 1957) (story, dialogues and lyrics)
17. Maya Bazaar (Tamil, 1957) (screen adaptation)
18. Missamma (1955) (story, dialogues, lyrics)
19. Guna Sundari (Tamil, 1955)(Story)
20. Chandraharam (1954)
21. Patala Bhairavi (1951) (dialogue) (story) (lyrics)
22. Gunasundari Katha (1949) (story, dialogues and lyrics)
23. Vindhyarani (1948) (dialogue) (story)
24. Bhale Pelli (1941) (dialogue) (story)
25. Sri Krishna Leelalu (1935) (dialogues)

== See also ==
- Pingali Venkayya, designer of the Indian flag
