= Vijaya Vauhini Studios =

Indian movie studio in Chennai

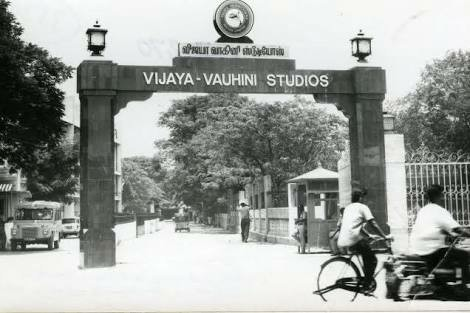
- Vijaya Vauhini Studios in 1953
- Industry: Motion picture
- Founded: 1948; 78 years ago
- Founder: Moola Narayana Swamy; B. N. Reddy
- Headquarters: Chennai, Tamil Nadu, India
- Area served: India
- Key people: Nagi Reddi; Chakrapani

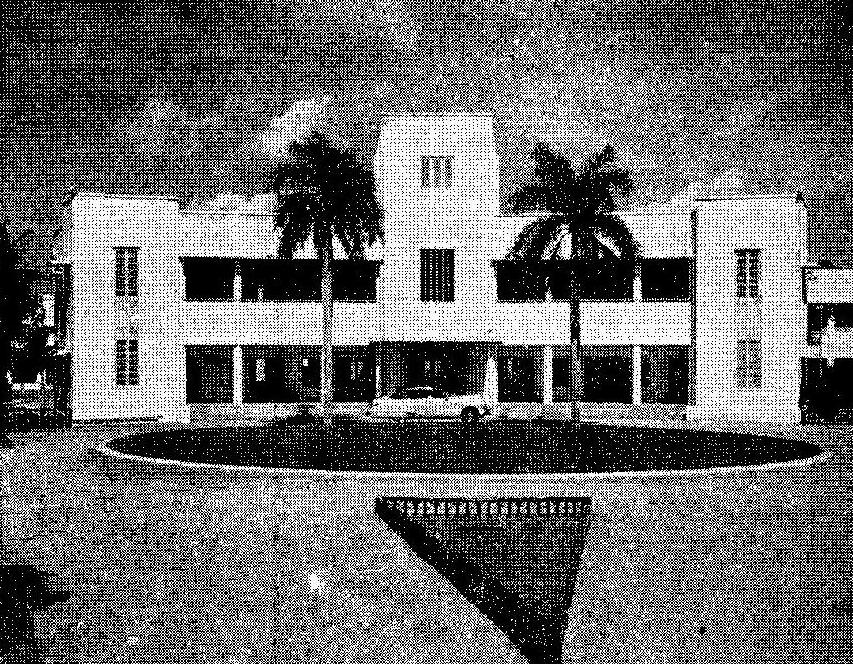
An old image of the studio c. 1952

Vauhini Pictures advertisement in 1948 issue of Chandamama magazine.

Vijaya Vauhini Studios is a film production company based in Chennai, India. It is the combination of Vijaya Productions and Vauhini Studios. B. Nagi Reddy (Bommireddy Nagi Reddy) was the founder of Vijaya Productions and Moola Narayana Swamy founded Vauhini Studios.

== History ==
Once considered the largest film studio in Asia, Vijaya Vauhini Studios resulted from the merger between Vauhini Studios and Vijaya Productions, in 1948 when Telugu film producer Moola Narayana Swamy leased the studios which was under heavy liabilities to the Vijaya Productions run by B. Nagi Reddy (Bommireddy Nagi Reddy), Chakrapani who were one time partners of Moola Narayana Swamy in the 1930s.

== Productions ==
Some of these films such as Pathala Bhairavi (1951), Pelli Chesi Choodu (1952), Chandraharam (1954), and Maya Bazar (1957) were dubbed into Tamil at the same time, Missamma was remade as Missiamma (1955) with Gemini Ganesan playing N. T. Rama Rao's role. Excepting a few films like Chandraharam (1954) and Uma Chandi Gowri Sankarula Katha (1968), most films made by Vijaya Productions were successful at the box office.

== Filmography ==
Year	Title	Language	Cast	Director	Notes			
1950	Shavukaru	Telugu	N. T. Rama Rao, Govindrajula Subba Rao	L. V. Prasad				
1951	Pathala Bhairavi	Telugu / Tamil	N. T. Rama Rao, K. Malati, S. V. Ranga Rao	K. V. Reddy				
1952	Kalyanam Panni Paar	Tamil	N. T. Rama Rao, G. Varalakshmi, K. Savithri, S. V. Ranga Rao	L. V. Prasad				
1952	Pelli Chesi Choodu	Telugu	N. T. Rama Rao, G. Varalakshmi, K. Savithri, S. V. Ranga Rao	L. V. Prasad				
1953	Chandraharam	Telugu / Tamil	N. T. Rama Rao, Sriranjani, S. V. Ranga Rao, K. Savithri, Relangi	K. Kameswara Rao				
1955	Missamma	Telugu	N. T. Rama Rao, A. Nageswara Rao, Jamuna, K. Savithri, S. V. Ranga Rao, Relangi, Ramana Reddy	L. V. Prasad				
1955	Missiamma	Tamil	Gemini Ganesan, K. A. Thangavelu, Jamuna, K. Savithri, S. V. Ranga Rao, K. Sarangapani. M. N. Nambiar	L. V. Prasad				
1955	Guna Sundari	Tamil	Gemini Ganesan, K. Savithri, S. V. Ranga Rao, M. N. Nambiar	K. Kameswara Rao				
1957	Mayabazar	Telugu	N. T. Rama Rao, A. Nageswara Rao, K. Savithri, S. V. Ranga Rao	K. V. Reddy				
1957	Maya Bajaar	Tamil	N. T. Rama Rao, Gemini Ganesan, K. Savithri, S. V. Ranga Rao	K. V. Reddy				
1958	Kadan Vaangi Kalyaanam	Tamil	Gemini Ganesan, K. Savithri, T. R. Ramachandran, Jamuna, S. V. Ranga Rao, T. S. Balaiah, K. A. Thangavelu, E. V. Saroja	L. V. Prasad				
1959	Appu Chesi Pappu Koodu	Telugu	N. T. Rama Rao, K. Savithri, Jaggayya, Jamuna, S. V. Ranga Rao, C. S. R. Anjaneyulu, Relangi, Girija	L. V. Prasad				
1961	Jagadeka Veeruni Katha	Telugu	N. T. Rama Rao, B. Saroja Devi, L. Vijaya Lakshmi, Jayanthi, Bala, Rajanala and Relangi	K. V. Reddy				
1962	Gundamma Katha	Telugu	N. T. Rama Rao, A. Nageswara Rao, S. V. Ranga Rao, K. Savithri, Jamuna, L. Vijaya Lakshmi	K. Kameswara Rao				
1962	Manithan Maravillai	Tamil	Gemini Ganesan, A. Nageswara Rao, S. V. Ranga Rao, K. Savithri, Jamuna, L. Vijaya Lakshmi	K. Kameswara Rao				
1963	Maduve Madi Nodu	Kannada						
1965	Satya Harischandra	Kannada/ Telugu	Dr.Rajkumar, Pandari Bai, Udayakumar, Narasimha Raju	H. Krishnamurthy				
1965	CID	Telugu	NTR, Jamuna, Gummadi, Relangi, Rajanala	Tapi Chanakya				
1965	Enga Veetu Pillai	Tamil	MGR, Saroja Devi, Nambiyar	Sanakya				
1965	Enga Veetu Penn	Tamil						
1967	Ram Aur Shyam	Hindi	Dilip Kumar, Waheeda Rehman, Mumtaz, Nirupa Roy, Pran	Tapi Chanakya				
1968	Uma Chandi Gowri Sankarula Katha	Telugu	N.T. Rama Rao, B. Saroja Devi	K. V. Reddy				
1969	Nam Naadu	Tamil	M.G.R, Jayalalitha	C. P. Jambulingam				
1969	Nannha Farishta	Hindi	Pran, Balraj Sahni, Ajit, Padmini, Anwar Hussain	T. Prakash Rao				
1970	Ghar Ghar Ki Kahani	Hindi	Balraj Sahni, Nirupa Roy, Om Prakash, Shashikala, Rakesh Roshan, Bharathi					
1973	Ganga Manga	Telugu	Krishna, Sobhan Babu, and Vanisri	Tapi Chanakya, V. Ramachandra Rao	25th Film			
1974	Vani Rani	Tamil	Sivaji Ganesan, Vanisri, R. Muthuraman	Tapi Chanakya C. V. Rajendran				
1975	Julie	Hindi	Lakshmi, Vikram, Utpal Dutt	K. S. Sethumadhavan				
1976	Sree Rajeswari Vilas Coffee Club	Telugu	Krishna, Jayapradha and Jaggayya	Bapu Sattiraju Lakshminarayana				
1977	Yehi Hai Zindagi	Hindi	Sanjeev Kumar, Vikram Gokhale, Seema Deo, Utpal Dutt	Sethu Madhavan				
1978	Swarag Narak	Hindi	Sanjeev Kumar, Jeetendra, Vinod Mehra, Shabana Azmi, Moushumi Chatterjee, Tanuja	Dasari Narayana Rao				
1980	Swayamvar	Hindi	Sanjeev Kumar, Shashi Kapoor, Moushumi Chatterjee, Vidya Sinha	P. Sambasiva Rao				
1982	Shriman Shrimati	Hindi	Sanjeev Kumar, Raakhee, Rakesh Roshan, Deepti Naval, Amol Palekar, Sarika	Vijay Reddy				
1993	Uzhaippali	Tamil	Rajinikanth, Roja Selvamani	P. Vasu				
1993	Karuppu Vellai	Tamil	Rahman, Suganya, Nassar	Manobala				
1994	Bhairava Dweepam	Telugu	Nandamuri Balakrishna, Roja Selvamani	Singeetam Srinivasa Rao				
1994	Nammavar	Tamil	Kamal Haasan, Gouthami	K. S. Sethumadhavan				
1996	Meendum Savithri |Telugu| As Neti Sarvathi || Visu	Tamil	Telugu as neti sarvathi		2006	Mercury Pookkal	Srikanth, Meera Jasmine	S. S. Stanley
2007	Thamirabharani	Tamil	Vishal, Muktha (Bhanu)	Hari				
2009	Padikkathavan	Tamil	Dhanush, Tamannaah Bhatia	Suraj				
2011	Venghai	Tamil	Dhanush, Tamannaah Bhatia	Hari				
2014	Veeram	Tamil	Ajith Kumar, Tamannaah Bhatia, Santhanam	Siva				
2017	Bairavaa	Tamil	Vijay, Keerthy Suresh	Bharathan				
2019	Sanga Thamizhan	Tamil	Vijay Sethupathi, Nivetha Pethuraj, Raashi Khanna	Vijay Chander				

== Awards ==
S.no	Ceremony	Year	Category	Nominee	Result
1	National Film Awards	1994	National Film Award for Best Feature Film in Tamil	Nammavar	Won
2	Tamil Nadu State Film Awards	1994	Tamil Nadu State Film Award for Best Film (Second prize)	Nammavar	Won
3	Nandi Awards	1994	Nandi Award for Best Feature Film (third prize)	Bhairava Dweepam	Won
