= V. Nagayya =

Indian actor (1904–1973)

- Born: Vuppaladadiyam Nagayya Sarma; 28 March 1904; Repalle, Madras Presidency, British India (present-day Andhra Pradesh, India)
- Died: 30 December 1973 (aged 69)
- Occupations: Actor, composer, director, producer, writer and playback singer
- Years active: 1938–1973
- Awards: Padma Shri (1965)

Vuppaladadiyam Nagayya Sarma (28 March 1904 – 30 December 1973), popularly known as Chittoor Nagayya, was an Indian actor, singer, music composer, and director known for his works in Telugu cinema, Tamil cinema, and Telugu theatre. Nagayya was one of the first multilingual filmmakers in India. Indian film journalist Baburao Patel described Nagayya as "The Paul Muni of India". Nagayya was considered the best character actor in South Indian cinema during 1940s and 1950s. In 1965, he became the first South Indian actor to receive the Padma Shri in Arts from the Government of India for his contributions to Indian cinema.

Brought up in Chittoor, Nagayya was closely connected to Rama Vilasa Sabha, a Telugu theatre association in the city. He made his film debut in Gruhalakshmi (1938). He worked in several films of Vauhini Pictures such as Vande Mataram (1939), Sumangali (1940), Devata (1941), Swarga Seema (1945), and Beedhalapatlu (1947). Nagayya was also the protagonist in Viswa Mohini (1940), the first film on the Indian motion picture world.

Nagayya made significant contributions to Telugu cinema, and starred in about two hundred Telugu films. He was a method actor, and his forte was usually playing intense characters, often immersing himself in the study of the real character's traits and mannerisms. His other prominent film roles include the 14th-century poet Pothana in Bhakta Potana (1942), 17th-century saint Tyagaraja in Thyagayya (1946), 12th-century saint Gora Kumbhar in Chakradhari (1948), and Sivaram in the social problem film Naa Illu (1953).

In 1964, Nagayya essayed the 17th-century saint Bhadrachala Ramadasu in the film Ramadasu which he had also co-written, directed and produced. The film won the National Film Award for Best Feature Film in Telugu. Nagayya also starred in about one hundred and sixty films in Tamil, Kannada, Malayalam, and Hindi. In his honour, the Chittoor Nagayya Kalakshetram of Arts was established in Chittoor of Andhra Pradesh.

== Early life ==
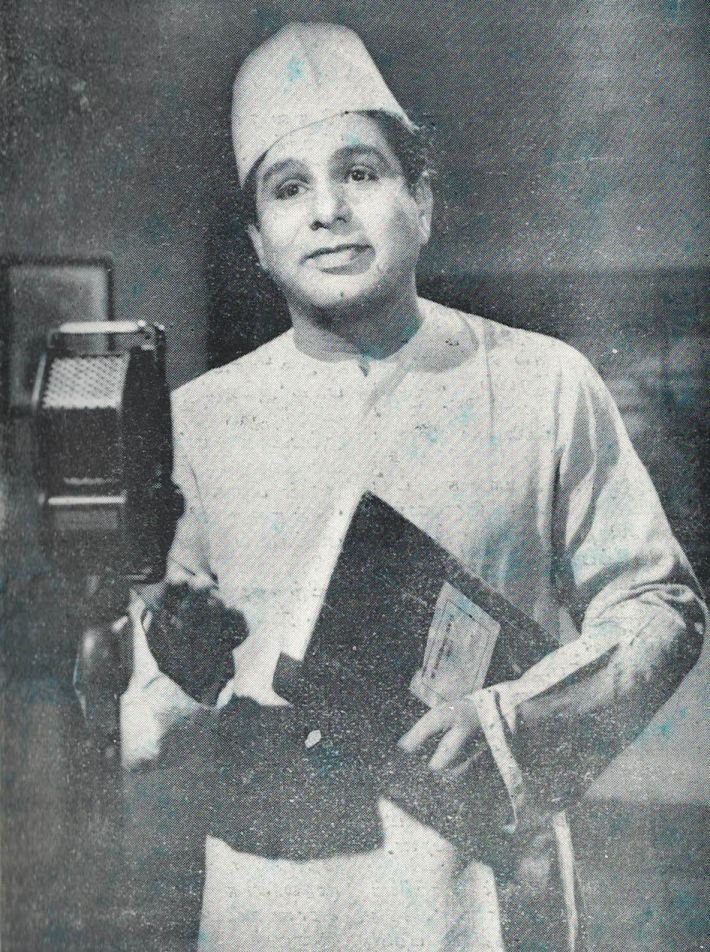
Screenshot of Nagayya in a talking picture

Nagayya was born on 28 March 1904 in a Telugu family in a tiny hamlet near Repalle, Guntur district, Andhra Pradesh. His parents were Ramalinga Sarma and Venkata Lakshmamba. His maternal grandmother adopted him and took him to her native village, Gonugur, near Kuppam and later to Chittoor. He took up studies with a scholarship provided by the Tirupati Devasthanam and took his degree in Chittoor.

After working as a clerk in a government office, Nagayya became a journalist with Andhra Patrika. Mahatma Gandhi and Nehru influenced him and he participated in the freedom struggle (Dandi Satyagraha) in 1930, later going on to work for some gramophone companies including Hutchins as well as attending the Gowhati Congress conclave with S. Srinivasa Iyyengar. He was married to Jaya Lakshmi, but she died giving birth to a daughter a year later. He then married Girija, and she too died due to miscarriage in the eighth month. His first daughter died of an undiagnosed illness. He then participated in long stays at Ramana Maharshi Ashram. He had family in Tirupati, including his brother's (Vuppaladadiyam Subrahmanya Sarma) son, Vuppaladadiyam S. Haragopal and daughters (late Amruthavalli and late Kusuma), Lakshmi Narasimha and their children, Vuppaladadiyam Shyam Sundar and Vuppaladadiyam Pavan Kumar.

== Accolades ==
Civilian Awards

- Padmashri, Government of India in 1965

National honors

- Abinava Thyagaraju by the Maharaja of Travancore

National Film Awards

- National Film Award for Best Feature Film in Telugu (director) – 1964 for Ramadasu

State Awards

- Best Actor Award by the Andhra Film Journalists Association
- Felicitated by a life size statue in Panagal Park, Chennai at his demise.

== Selected filmography ==
=== Actor ===
Year	Title	Role	Language	Notes
1938	Gruhalakshmi	Gopinath	Telugu	
1939	Vande Mataram	Raghu	Telugu	
1940	Viswa Mohini	A Film Director	Telugu	
1940	Sumangali	Panthulu	Telugu	
1941	Devatha	Venu	Telugu	
1941	Ashok Kumar	King Ashoka	Tamil	
1943	Bhakta Potana	Pothana	Telugu	
1943	Bhagyalakshmi	Srinivasa Rao	Telugu	
1944	Chenchu Lakshmi	Chenchu Lakshmi's Father	Telugu	
1945	Swargaseema	Murthy	Telugu	
1945	Meera	King of Mewar	Tamil	
1946	Tyagayya	Tyagayya	Telugu	
1947	Yogi Vemana	Vemana	Telugu	
1948	Chakradhari	Korakumbar	Tamil	
1948	Bhaktha Jana	Namadeva	Tamil	
1949	Mana Desam		Telugu	
1949	Navajeevanam	Mahadevan	Tamil	
1950	Ezhai Padum Padu	Kandan	Tamil	
1950	Beedala Patlu		Telugu	
1951	Sarvadhikari		Tamil	
1952	Thai Ullam		Tamil	
1953	Ulagam		Tamil	
1953	Prapancham		Telugu	
1953	Penn		Tamil	
1953	Panakkari		Tamil	
1953	Naa Illu	Sivaram	Telugu	
1953	Ladki	Kamini's father	Hindi	
1953	Gumastha	Ranganatham	Tamil	
1953	Gumasta	Ranganatham	Telugu	
1953	En Veedu	Shivram	Tamil	
1954	Viduthalai	Periaswamy	Tamil	
1954	Thuli Visham		Tamil	
1954	Maa Gopi		Telugu	
1954	Edhir Paradhathu	Dayaparar	Tamil	
1954	Prapancham		Telugu	
1954	Sangham		Telugu	
1955	Kanavaney Kankanda Deivam		Tamil	
1955	Anarkali	Raja Mansingh	Telugu	
1955	Nam Kuzhandai		Tamil	
1956	Tenali Ramakrishna	Mahamantri Thimmarusu	Telugu	
1956	Uma Sundari		Telugu	
1956	Pennin Perumai	Zamindar, father of Ragunathan / Nagendran	Tamil	
1956	Naga Panchami		Telugu	
1956	Muddu Bidda		Telugu	
1956	Marmaveeran		Tamil	
1956	Asai		Tamil	
1956	Bhaktha Markandeya		Tamil, Kannada	
1956	Amara Deepam		Tamil	
1956	Tenali Raman	Appaji	Tamil	
1957	Yaar Paiyyan		Tamil	
1957	Vanangamudi		Tamil	
1957	Sati Savitri		Telugu	
1957	Panduranga Mahatyam	Jahnavi	Telugu	
1957	Nala Damayanthi		Telugu	
1957	Ambikapathy	Raja Kulothunga Chola I, the father of Amaravathi	Tamil	
1958	Piya Milan		Hindi	
1958	Sampoorna Ramayanam		Telugu	
1958	Pathi Bhakti	Butha Bhikshu	Tamil	guest appearance
1958	Parvati Kalyanam		Telugu	
1958	Ettuku Pai Ettu		Telugu	
1958	Bommala Pelli	Perayya	Telugu	
1958	Bommai Kalyanam	Varadarajan	Tamil	
1958	Illarame Nallaram		Tamil	
1959	Jayabheri	Viswambhara Sastri	Telugu	
1959	Sahodhari	Pazhani, father of Chandiran and Meena	Tamil	
1959	Nalla Theerpu		Tamil	
1959	Mahishasura Mardini	Shukracharya	Kannada	
1959	Kalaivanan		Tamil	
1959	Banda Ramudu		Telugu	
1960	Sri Venkateswara Mahatyam	Bhavaji	Telugu	
1960	Abhimanam		Telugu	
1961	Seetha Rama Kalyanam	Dasarathudu	Telugu	
1961	Intiki Deepam Illale		Telugu	
1961	Vagdanam	Vishwanatham (Vijaya's father)	Telugu	
1961	Sabash Raja		Telugu	
1961	Paava Mannippu		Tamil	
1961	Nichaya Thamboolam	Ramanna, a teacher who is the father of Seetha (Jamuna)	Tamil	
1961	Nagarjuna		Telugu	
1961	Kappalottiya Thamizhan	Ulaganatha Pillai	Tamil	
1961	Ellam Unakkaga		Tamil	
1961	Thirudathe		Tamil	
1961	Palum Pazhamum		Tamil	
1961	Manapanthal		Tamil	
1962	Gaali Medalu	Ranganatham the father of Krishna (NTR)	Telugu	
1962	Dakshayagnam	Dadhichi	Tamil	
1962	Dakshayagnam	Dadhichi	Telugu	
1962	Swarnamanjari		Telugu	
1962	Aalayamani		Tamil	
1962	Valar Pirai		Tamil	
1962	Thendral Veesum		Tamil	
1962	Aasa Jeevulu		Telugu	
1962	Siri Sampadalu	Nayudu	Telugu	
1962	Shantinivasam	Ramadasu the father of four children	Telugu	
1962	Padandi Munduku		Telugu	
1963	Sri Krishnarjuna Yudham	Akroora	Telugu	
1963	Lava Kusa	Valmiki Maharshi	Telugu	
1963	Amarshilpi Jakanachari			
1963	Naan Vanangum Dheivam		Tamil	
1963	Naanum Oru Penn		Tamil	
1963	Mani Osai			
1963	Lava Kusa	Valmiki	Hindu	
1963	Karpagam	Subramanian	Tamil	
1963	Bandipotu	Saluva Dharmanayaka	Telugu	
1963	Anuragam		Telugu	
1963	Lakshadhikari	Lakshadhikari Rangaiah	Telugu	
1964	Bobbili Yudham		Telugu	
1964	Ramadasu	Ramadasu	Telugu	
1964	Pachai Vilakku	Gopalayya	Tamil	
1964	Kai Koduttha Dheivam	Father of Latha	Tamil	
1964	Amarsilpi Jakanna		Telugu	
1964	Aggi Pidugu		Telugu	
1964	Aatma Balam		Telugu	
1964	Amarashilpi Jakanachari		Kannada	
1964	Chandavalliya Tota		Kannada	
1964	Annapoorna	Father of Annapurna	Kannada	
1964	Devatha	Father of Prasad	Telugu	
1964	Gudi Gantalu		Telugu	
1964	Aandavan Kattalai	Doctor	Tamil	
1965	Sumangali	Venkata Chalam	Telugu	
1965	Satya Harishchandra	Vasistha Maharshi	Telugu	
1965	Devatha		Telugu	
1965	Santhi	Kailasam Pillai	Tamil	
1965	Preminchi Choodu		Telugu	
1965	Enga Veetu Penn		Tamil	
1965	Sri Simhachala Kshetra Mahima	Father of Pururava	Telugu	
1965	Veerabhimanyu		Telugu	
1965	Dorikithe Dongalu		Telugu	
1966	Sri Krishna Pandaviyam		Telugu	
1966	Selvam		Tamil	
1966	Shakuntala		Telugu	
1966	Paramanandayya Sishyula Katha	Paramanandaiah	Telugu	
1966	Parakkum Paavai		Tamil	
1966	Navarathri		Telugu	
1966	Motor Sundaram Pillai		Tamil	
1966	Bhakta Potana	Vyasa Maharshi	Telugu	
1966	Adugu Jaadalu		Telugu	
1966	Aastiparulu	Diwan to Zamindar	Telugu	
1966	Sadhu Mirandal	Priest Micheal	Tamil	(Special Appearance)
1966	Saraswati Sabatham	Vidhyapathy father	Tamil	
1966	Srimathi	Himself	Telugu	
1967	Kanchukota	Raja Rajendra Bhupathi	Telugu	
1967	Sri Krishnavataram	Dhritarashtra	Telugu	
1967	Punyavathi		Telugu	
1967	Veera Pooja		Telugu	
1967	Rahasyam		Telugu	
1967	Poola Rangadu	Veeraiya	Telugu	
1967	Pattukunte Padivelu		Telugu	
1967	Iru Malargal	Sivasamy	Tamil	
1967	Bhama Vijayam		Telugu	
1967	Maa Vadina		Telugu	
1967	Private Master	Father of Private Master	Telugu	
1967	Marapurani Kadha	Madhava Rao	Telugu	
1968	Brahmachari		Telugu	
1968	Ramu		Tamil / Telugu	
1968	Deva kanya (1968 film)		Telugu	
1968	Thillana Mohanambal	Shanmugasundaram's Nadaswara Guru	Tamil	
1968	Nindu Samsaram		Telugu	
1968	Niluvu Dopidi	Swamiji the director of an orphanage	Telugu	
1968	Bandhavyalu		Telugu	
1968	Veeranjaneya	Valmiki	Telugu	
1968	Uyarndha Manithan	Manickam	Tamil	
1969	Sri Rama Katha	Dasaratha	Telugu	
1969	Saptaswaralu		Telugu	
1969	Nam Naadu	The school master Kandhaya	Tamil	
1969	Mooga Nomu		Telugu	
1969	Deiva Magan		Tamil	
1969	Jarigina Katha	Jagannatham	Telugu	
1969	Muhurtha Balam	Dharmaiah	Telugu	
1969	Annaiyum Pithavum		Tamil	
1969	Aadarsa Kutumbam		Telugu	
1969	Natakala Rayudu	Adiseshayya	Telugu	
1970	Akka Chellelu	Second judge	Telugu	
1970	Kaalam Vellum		Tamil	(Guest Appearance)
1970	Amma Kosam	Zamindar Dharma Rao	Telugu	
1970	Vidhi Vilasam	Retd. Engineer, Nirmala's father	Telugu	
1970	Thaali Bottu		Telugu	
1970	Engirundho Vandhaal	Dharmalingam	Tamil	
1970	Thalli Thandrulu	Raobahadur Perumallu	Telugu	
1970	Thabalkaran Thangai		Tamil	
1970	Raman Ethanai Ramanadi	Director Nagaiya	Tamil	
1970	Kanmalar		Tamil	
1970	Sorgam	Judge	Tamil	
1971	Srimanthudu		Telugu	
1971	Prema Nagar	Doctor	Telugu	
1971	Vichithra Dampathyam		Telugu	
1971	Pavitra Bandham		Telugu	
1971	Anuradha	Judge	Telugu	
1971	Rowdilaku Rowdilu	Kailasam	Telugu	
1971	Vintha Samsaram	Church Father and mentor to 'Prestige' Padmanabham	Telugu	
1971	Sri Krishna Satya		Telugu	
1971	Raitu Kutumbam		Telugu	
1971	Kula Gourava		Kannada	
1971	Jeevitha Chakram	Father of Raja (NTR)	Telugu	
1971	Iru Thuruvam	Teacher	Tamil	
1971	C.I.D.Raju		Telugu	
1971	Thangaikkaaga		Tamil	
1971	Ramalayam	Temple priest	Telugu	
1971	Pavitra Hrudayalu	Zamindar Bhujanga Rao	Telugu	
1971	Sampoorna Ramayanam	Vasishta Mahamuni	Telugu	
1972	Papam Pasivadu	Doctor	Telugu	
1972	Shakti Leelai		Tamil	
1972	Pedda Koduku		Telugu	
1972	Muhammad bin Tughluq		Telugu	
1972	Neethi	Judge	Tamil	
1972	Nijam Nirupistha	Zamindar Jaggayya	Telugu	
1972	Iddaru Ammayilu	Laxman Rao	Telugu	
1972	Goodu Putani		Telugu	
1972	Beedala Patlu		Telugu	
1972	Bala Bharatam		Telugu	
1972	Raja	Haridass	Tamil	
1972	Shakthi Leelai	Guruji	Tamil	
1972	Ganga Gauri		Tamil	
1972	Inti Kodalu		Telugu	
1973	Vishali		Telugu	
1973	Desoddharakulu		Telugu	
1973	Pattikaattu Ponnaiya		Tamil	
1973	Panjaramlo Pasipapa		Telugu	
1973	Puttinillu Mettinillu		Telugu	
1974	Lav Kush	Valmiki	Hindi	
1974	Uttama Illalu	Narayana Rao	Telugu	
1974	Sivagamiyin Selvan	Church Father	Tamil	
1974	Inti Kodalu		Telugu	
1975	Mallela Manasulu	Do-gooder who helps Annapurna and her children	Telugu	
1976	Tu Hi Ram Tu Hi Krishna		Hindi	
1976	Kula Gowravam		Tamil	
1978	Ennai Pol Oruvan	Sundaramoorthy's Father	Tamil	(final film role)

Composer and play back singer

Year	Title	Song
1938	Gruhalakshmi	Lendu Bharata Veerulara
1953	Gumasta	Oyi Parugekkadikoyi
1953	Prapancham	Anta Kooleelam Manamanta Kooleelam, Premasudha Sarasilo Hamsalamai
1953	Sangham	Jati Bhedam Samasipoda
1954	Maa Gopi	Sanubhoothiye Leda Jagatini, Amma Krishnamma Apacharamemitamma
1956	Bhakta Markandeya	Om Namasivaya, Jaya Jaya Sankara Sambasadasiva
1956	Naga Panchami	Sambho Mahadeva
1956	Muddu Bidda	Itulela Chesavaya O Devadeva
1956	Tenali Ramakrishna	Gandupilli Menu Marichi
1956	Tenali Ramakrishna	"Putrile Pambirukkum...Kottaiyile Oru Kaalatthile"
1957	Nala Damayanti	Ghorambaina Daavagni Keelakerayai
1957	Panduranga Mahatyam	Jaya Jaya Gokula Bala, Sannuti Seyave Manasa
1962	Swarnamanjari	Madhuramaina Guru Deevena
1967	Maa Vadina	Suthudilu Peeda Mandiramu (poem)
1967	Poola Rangadu	Chillara Rallaku Mokkutu Unte Chedipoduvura

Playback singer

- Ramadasu (1964)
- Tenali Raman
- Gumasta (1953/II) (playback singer and composer)
- Naa Illu (1953) (playback singer and composer)
- Yogi Vemana (1947) (playback singer and composer)
- Thyagayya (1946) (playback singer and composer)
- Swargaseema (1945) (playback singer and composer)
- Bhakta Potana (1942) (playback singer and composer)
- Devatha (1941) (playback singer and composer)
- Sumangali (1940) (playback singer and composer)
- Viswa Mohini (1940) (playback singer)
- Vande Mataram (1939) (playback singer and composer)
- Gruhalakshmi (1938) (playback singer)

Director (partial filmography)

- Ramadasu (Telugu, 1964)
- En Veedu (Tamil, 1953)
- Naa Illu (Telugu, 1953)
- Thyagayya (Telugu, 1946)

Producer (partial filmography)

- Naa Illu (1953)

Writer (partial filmography)

- Thyagayya (1946)
