= Pyroclastic rocks, Peddapalli =

Geological formation in Karnataka, India

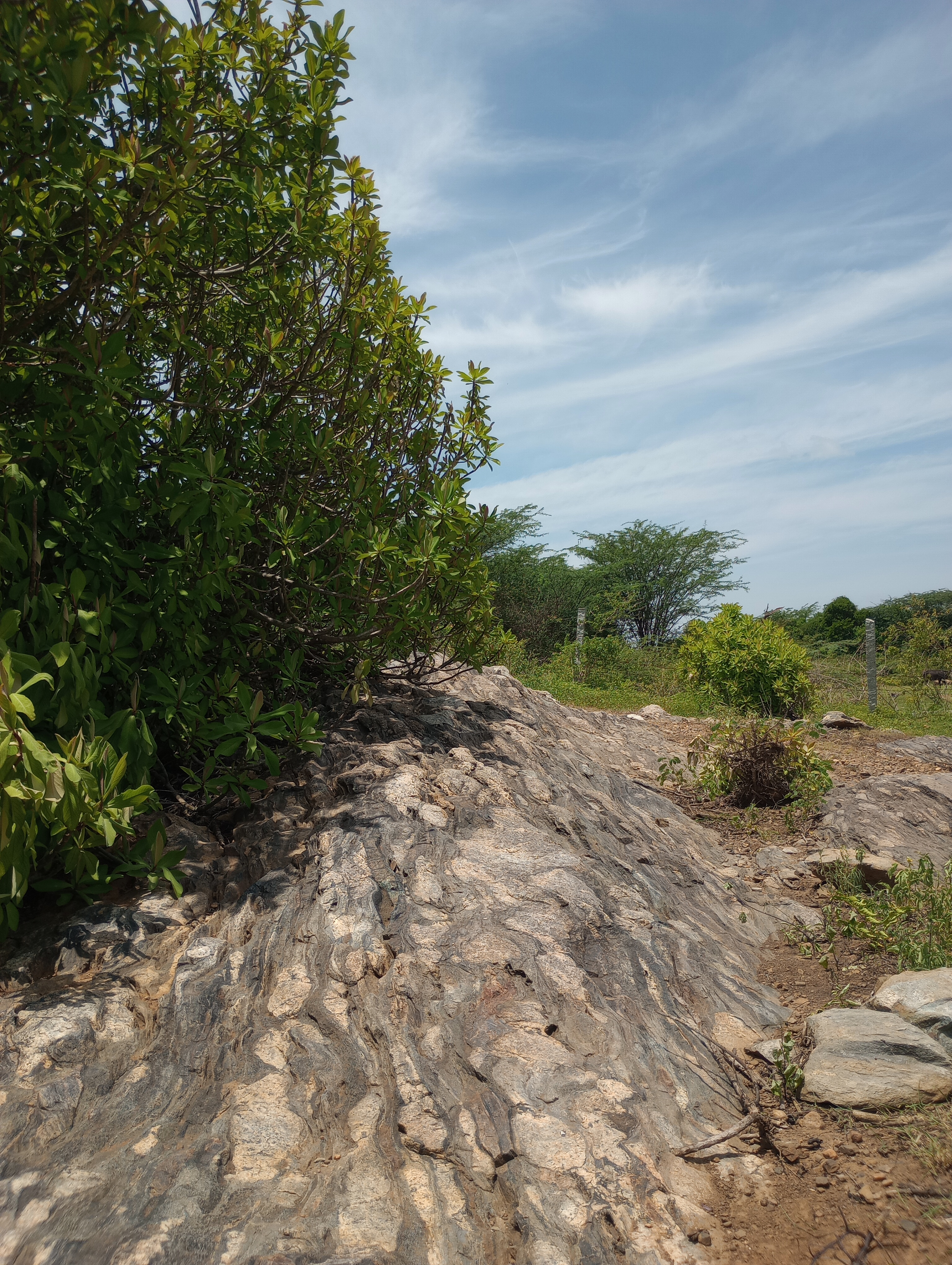

- Location within Karnataka
- Coordinates: 12°58′36″N 78°16′06″E
- Location: Peddapalli, Kolar Gold Fields, Karnataka, India

National Geological Monuments of India
- Official name: Pyroclastic rocks, Peddapalli
- Designated: 1976
- Designated by: Geological Survey of India

Pyroclastic rocks at Peddapalli is a geological formation in Kolar district of the Indian state of Karnataka. Located in the gold mining region of Kolar, the site consists of a welded agglomerate containing various igneous rocks set in ignimbrite. It was declared as a National Geological Monument by the Geological Survey of India in 1976.

== Geography ==
The geological formation is located in the gold mining region of Kolar district, Karnataka. It was notified as a National Geological Monument by the Geological Survey of India in 1976.

== Geology ==
Tephra refers to the fragmental material produced during volcanic eruptions. Pyroclastic rocks are volcanic rocks formed by the consolidation of pyroclasts in the tephra produced by explosive fragmentation of magma or pre-existing basement rocks during these volcanic eruptions. These rocks are classified according to the size and composition of the material found.

Pyroclastic rocks at Peddapalli comprise a welded agglomerate of various igneous rocks such as granite, gneiss, basalt, and banded ferruginous quartzite, set in a matrix of ignimbrite. These are rounded in shape and measure up to 80 cm (31 in) in diameter. These rocks were formed when fragments were detached from the surrounding country rocks during violent submarine volcanic eruptions. The rock characteristics indicate that they were formed by ignimbritic magma associated with a glowing-avalanche type of eruption.

The rocks form part of the Kolar Schist Belt and are approximately 2.9 billion years old. The Kolar Schist Belt consists of amphibolites of various textural varieties.

== See also ==
- Pillow lavas, Maradihalli
- Pillow lavas, Nomira
