= Sendra Granite =

Geological feature in Rajasthan

- Location within Rajasthan
- Coordinates: 26°5′3.6″N 74°13′17.8″E
- Location: Pali district, Rajasthan, India

National Geological Monuments of India
- Official name: Sendra Granite
- Designated: 1977
- Designated by: Geological Survey of India

Sendra Granite is a igneous rock formation in Pali district, Rajasthan, India. It was declared as a National Geological Monument by the Geological Survey of India in 1977.

== Geography ==
The geological formation occurs at an altitude of 430 m (1,410 ft) at Sendra near Beawar in Pali district, Rajasthan. It was declared as a National Geological Monument by the Geological Survey of India in 1977.

== Geology ==
Sendra Granite consists of old granite, dating to about 1.2 Ga, intruded at depth into the Beawar Formation of the Delhi Supergroup, dating to 1.5 Ga. This was followed by uplift to the surface and denudation by weathering over the past ~600 Ma. Silica-rich magma cool gradually at depth to form granite, as at Sendra, or reach the surface to form rhyolite, welded tuff or ignimbrite as in Jodhpur and adjoining areas. The Sendra Granite shows a wider variety of natural rock architecture compared to other younger formations such as the Erinpura Granite, dating to about Ma.
