= Great Boundary Fault, Satur =

Geological feature in Satur, India

Great Boundary Fault
- Geological feature
- Location within Rajasthan
- Coordinates: 25°28′41″N 75°33′32″E
- Location: Satur, Bundi district, Rajasthan, India
- Age: 900 to 1500 Ma

National Geological Monuments of India
- Official name: Great Boundary Fault at Satur
- Designated: 1976
- Designated by: Geological Survey of India

The Great Boundary Fault is a geological feature in Satur in Bundi district of the Indian state of Rajasthan. The fault occurring in the region between the Aravalli and the Vindhya Ranges separate the younger sedimentary rocks of the Vindhyas, formed about 900 Ma, from the older pre-Aravalli rocks, formed about 1500 to 3500 Ma. It was declared as a National Geological Monument by the Geological Survey of India in 1976.

== Geography ==
The Great Boundary Fault is located between the Aravalli and the Vindhya Ranges in the Bundi district of the Indian state of Rajasthan. The fault extends from the eastern border of Rajasthan, south of Agra and Bharatpur, towards the west of Chittaurgarh and continues further southwest. At Satur, the Deoli–Tonk–Jaipur road passes through the fault zone. It was declared as a National Geological Monument by the Geological Survey of India in 1976.

== Geology ==
The geological feature represents a zone of disruption consisting of parallel and oblique faults, which produce distinctive step-like features. It separates the younger sedimentary rocks of the Vindhyas, formed about 900 Ma, to the east from the older, more deformed and metamorphosed pre-Aravalli rocks, formed about 1500 to 3500 Ma. Deformed limestone is present at the site and white debris of silica from an open-cast mine occurs to the east of the fault.

Studies of the fault show evidence of three successive tectonic events–thrusting, strike-slip faulting, and thrusting. These movements were accompanied by changes in underground fluid pressure, causing fluids to move through fractures and faults. The fluids were mainly saline Na–Ca–Cl brines derived from groundwater trapped within the rocks. The strike-slip movement occurred at temperatures of about 160–202 °C (320–396 °F) and a pressure of around 53 MPa (7,700 psi). The study suggests that earthquakes may have helped drive the flow of these fluids and the high temperatures were probably related to crustal stretching, volcanic activity and heat from the underlying Berach granite.

== See also ==
- Eparchaean Unconformity – Geological feature in Tirumala, India
