= Gossan, Rajpura-Dariba =

Geological formation in Odisha, India

- Location within Rajasthan
- Coordinates: 24°56′33.3″N 74°7′46.3″E
- Location: Rajpura–Dariba, Rajsamand district, Rajasthan, India

National Geological Monuments of India
- Official name: Gossan in Rajpura-Dariba Mineralised belt
- Designated: 1976
- Designated by: Geological Survey of India

Gossan in Rajpura–Dariba is a geological formation in the mineral belt in Rajsamand district of the Indian state of Rajasthan. These thick, colourful rocks were formed through prolonged weathering and oxidation of sulfide minerals. It was declared as a National Geological Monument by the Geological Survey of India in 1976.

== Geography ==
The gossan is distributed on a 510 m (1,670 ft) high hill that stretches for about 4.7 km (2.9 mi) near Dariba in Rajsamand district, Rajasthan. The geological site was notified as a National Geological Monument by the Geological Survey of India in 1976.

== History ==
Rajpura-Dariba has a long history of mining, as indicated by large heaps of slag and numerous ancient underground workings excavated from the site. Radiocarbon dating suggests that mining activity at the site dates to approximately 3,040 ± 150 years BP. The presence of a prominent gossan over the ore deposit may have helped ancient miners identify concealed metallic mineralisation, as gossans are distinctive surface indicators of underlying sulfide deposits. The Arthashastra, attributed to Chanakya (c. 350–283 BCE), also describes the recognition of ore guides and emphasises the importance of mineral wealth to the state treasury. A Chalcolithic copper-working site, formerly known as "Tambavati Nagri" (Copper Town), has been excavated at Ayad and is considered broadly contemporary with the Indus Valley Civilization of the 3rd millennium BCE.

== Geology ==
The mineralised zone at Rajpura-Dariba developed through extensive chemical weathering and pervasive oxidation of sulfide and sulphosalt ores over prolonged geological periods under favourable climatic conditions, forming a thick gossan composed of secondary minerals. The gossan exhibits a variety of colours, including reddish brown, brown, dark brown, bluish green, white, and grey, along with diverse boxwork structures. Limonitic minerals form the predominant constituent of the gossan and impart the characteristic reddish-brown to yellow colour capping.

The surface expression and characteristics of the gossan serve as a geological guide to the polymetallic sulfide and sulphosalt ore deposits concealed beneath the surface. The limonitic constituents of the gossan are formed from different minerals and the morphology and distribution of these products provide an approximate indication of the original metal content of the ores from which they were derived. The principal primary ore minerals are sphalerite, galena, and chalcopyrite, with zinc as the dominant base metal, followed by lead and copper.
