= Naga Hills Ophiolite =

Geological feature in Nagaland

- Location within Nagaland
- Coordinates: 25°37′28.34″N 94°44′43.2626″E
- Location: Pungro, Kiphire district, Nagaland, India

National Geological Monuments of India
- Official name: Naga Hills Ophiolite
- Designated: 2001
- Designated by: Geological Survey of India

The ophiolite at Naga Hills is an example of oceanic lithosphere obducted onto continental crust along the Indo–Burma convergence zone. The representative feature at Pungro in Kiphire district, Nagaland, was declared as a National Geological Monument by the Geological Survey of India in 2001.

== Geography ==
Naga Hills are a northern extension of the Arakan Mountains. The hills stretch along the India-Myanmar border, and form part of the Indian state of Nagaland and the Burmese region of Sagaing. Ophiolite occurs in the central part of the hills. The representative feature at Pungro in Kiphire district, Nagaland, was declared as a National Geological Monument by the Geological Survey of India in 2001.

== Geology ==
The Naga Hills Ophiolite is an example of oceanic lithosphere obducted onto continental crust. It preserves a rare and relatively complete ophiolitic sequence comprising magmatic and sedimentary rocks from the Mesozoic to Cenozoic periods. The ophiolite consists of parallel to sub-parallel tectonic slices of different lithological units arranged in an echelon formation consisting of metasediments of possible Mesozoic, folded ophiolite from Late Cretaceous, flysch from Eocene, and sediments and molasse sediments from the later period. The Naga Hills Ophiolite is located within the India–Myanmar suture zone. It provides important evidence of the evolution of the Tethys Ocean and the processes responsible for the orogeny of the mountain ranges in the region.

The basalt in the ophiolites were formed in submarine conditions during the evolution of the Tethys Ocean. The cherts, which are composed of cryptocrystalline quartz mixed with iron oxides and clay minerals, were formed from depositions along with basalt and limestone, and consist of poorly preserved micro fossils. Other rock types that form part of the ophiolite include dunite, harzburgite, lherzolite, wehrlite, and pyroxenite. The Naga Hills Ophiolite is tectonically bordered by the metamorphic rocks Naga Complex to the east, shows evidence of intrusion into the Disang flysch along its western margin, and is overridden by metamorphics of the Nimi Formation from the east.
