= Eparchaean Unconformity =

Geological feature in Tirumala, India

- Geological feature
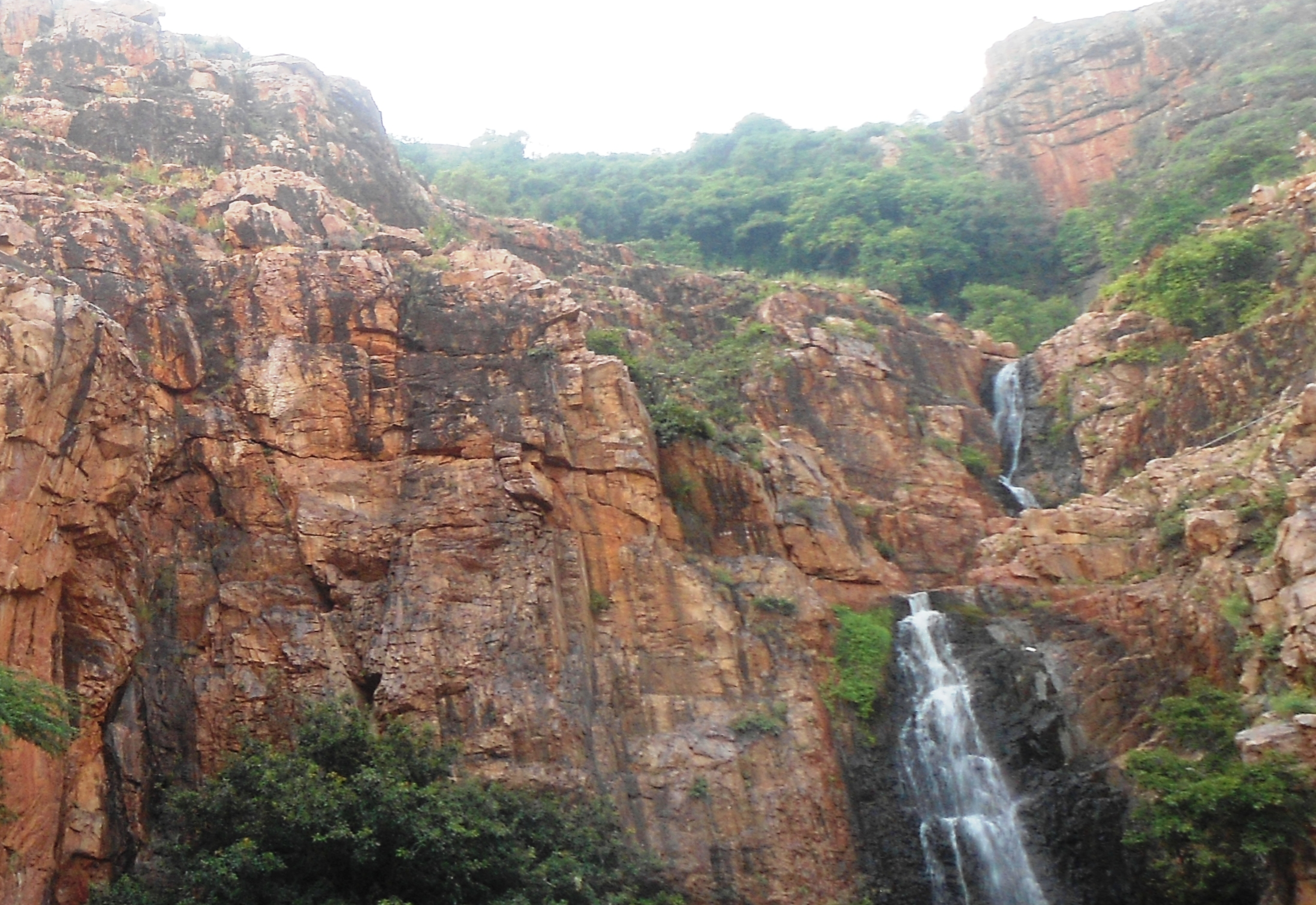

- Location within Andhra Pradesh
- Coordinates: 13.6833°N 79.35°E
- Location: Tirumala, Andhra Pradesh, India
- Range: Seshachalam Hills
- Part of: Eastern Ghats

National Geological Monuments of India
- Official name: Eparchean Unconformity, Tirumala Hills
- Designated: 1976
- Designated by: Geological Survey of India

Eparchaean Unconformity is a significant stratigraphic discontinuity in the geological history of the Earth. It separates the Nagari Quartzites of the Proterozoic Kadapa Supergroup, dating to 1.6 Ga, are separated from the older Archean Peninsular Gneissic Complex, dating to 2.3 Ga. The unconformity is exposed at several locations in the Kadapa Basin, and is prominently visible along the Tirumala ghat roads in the Seshachalam Range of the Eastern Ghats. The Eparchaean Unconformity at Tirumala was declared as a National Geological Monument by the Geological Survey of India in 1976.

== Geography ==
The Eparchaean Unconformity is exposed along the Ghat section leading to Tirumala. It forms part of Sapthagiri hills in the Seshachalam Range of the Eastern Ghats. It was declared as a National Geological Monument by the Geological Survey of India in 1976. The highest point on the range is located atop the Venkatadri at about 980 m (3,220 ft) above sea level. The Venkateswara Temple at Tirumala, dedicated to Venkateswara, an avatar of the Hindu god Vishnu, is located atop the hill.

== Geology ==
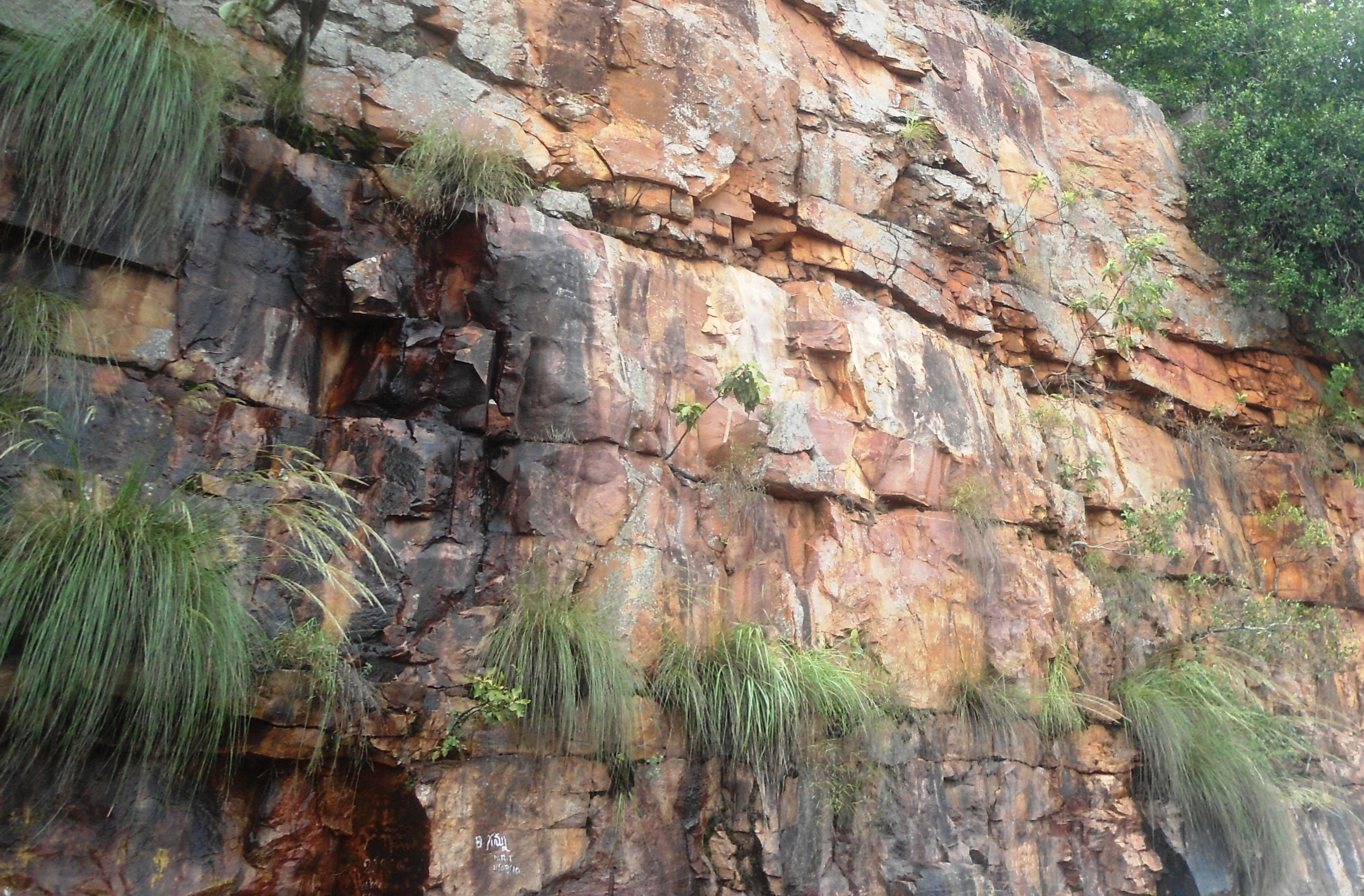
Rock face along the Tirumala ghat roads

The Tirumala Hills are composed predominantly of Precambrian sedimentary rocks, particularly quartzites and intercalated shales. These rocks are known as the Nagari Quartzites and form part of the Kadapa Supergroup. The Eparchaean Unconformity in the Tirumala Hills is a major geological boundary that represents a period of no rock deposition and separates the Nagari Quartzites of the Proterozoic Kadapa Supergroup, dating to 1.6 Ga, from the older Archean Peninsular Gneissic Complex, dating to 2.3 Ga. The Peninsular Gneissic Complex consists of granites, gneisses, and dolerite dykes. The unconformity represents a time gap of more than 800 million years. It marks a period of remarkable geological quiescence, with little structural disturbance or igneous activity.

The sedimentary thickness of the Kadapa Basin is of the order of 12 km (7.5 mi) and includes volcanic sequences in the form of sills and dykes, which rest on Archaean peninsular gneissic complex marked by the unconformity. In the Kadapa Basin, the unconformity is represented by the Gulcheru Conglomerate, the earliest sedimentary unit of the Kadapa Supergroup. The initiation of basin sedimentation is generally placed at about 2.0–2.1 Ga. The unconformity is also exposed along the Kurnool–Nandyal road, where about 20 m (66 ft) thick Gulcheru Formation rests unconformably on the Gadwal Schist Belt. An equally thick succession of the Gulcheru Formation is exposed at Parnapalli along the Veldurthi–Pulivendla road, where it rests on Archean granitic gneisses.

== See also ==
- Natural Arch, Tirumala hills – National Geo-heritage Monument in Andhra Pradesh, India
