= Marine Gondwana Fossil Park =

Paleontology site in Chhattisgarh

- Location within Chhattisgarh
- Coordinates: 23°12′23.46″N 82°13′12.27″E
- Location: Ammakherwa, Surguja district, Chhattisgarh, India

National Geological Monuments of India
- Official name: Marine Gondwana Fossil Park
- Designated: 1983
- Designated by: Geological Survey of India

Marine Gondwana Fossil Park is located near Ammakherwa in Surguja district, Chhattisgarh. Spread across 16,200 m^{2} (174,000 sq ft) in the Satpura Range, the park preserves marine fossils dating to the Permian (280–240 Ma) on carbonaceous Talchir Formation belonging to Gondwana Supergroup. It was declared as a National Geological Monument by the Geological Survey of India in 1983.

== Geography and history ==
The fossil park is located near Ammakherwa village in Surguja district, Chhattisgarh. Spread over 16,200 m^{2} (174,000 sq ft), the site extends for about 1 km (0.62 mi) in the Satpura Range near the confluence of Hasia Nala with Hasdeo River. The site was discovered in 1954 and was declared as a National Geological Monument by the Geological Survey of India in 1983.

== Description ==
The park preserves a collection of marine invertebrate fossils. The assemblage includes pelecypods such as Eurydesma and Aviculopecten, bryozoans, crinoids, and foraminifers. The fossils occur in the carbonaceous Talchir Formation of the Gondwana Supergroup, dating to the Permian, about 280–240 Ma. The park also contains igneous rock intrusions such as granite occurring along with quartz, feldspar, mica, amphiboles, and other minerals.

== Formation ==
The presence of these fossils in Central India indicate a marine transgression into this part of the land during the Permian. Marine organisms, which lived along the seaward margin, were preserved under layers of grey shale, glacial deposits, and density-flow deposits. Several hypotheses have been proposed for the marine incursion during the period. As per one such theory, a wide inlet from the north, connected to the Tethys Sea, covered the fossil-bearing areas. Another theory proposes that the incursion resulted from a rise in the mean sea level of the Tethys, followed by deglaciation and the sea subsequently receded after adjustments toward isostatic equilibrium.
