= Bedded Barytes, Mangampet =

Geological feature in Andhra Pradesh

- Location within Andhra Pradesh
- Coordinates: 14°1′14″N 79°19′6″E
- Location: Mangampet, Annamayya district, Andhra Pradesh, India

National Geological Monuments of India
- Official name: Bedded Barytes, Mangampet
- Designated: 1982
- Designated by: Geological Survey of India

Bedded Barytes is a geological feature in Mangampet village of Annamayya district in the Indian state of Andhra Pradesh. Located in the Kadapa Basin, it represents the world's largest known deposit of baryte, which occurs as Barium sulfate. It was declared as a National Geological Monument by the Geological Survey of India in 1982.

== Geography ==
The geological feature is located near Mangampet village in Annamayya district, Andhra Pradesh. It is the largest baryte deposit in the world, containing about 98% of India's baryte reserves and 28% of the world's baryte reserves. It consists of two stratiform lenses, each extending up to 1.2 km (0.75 mi) in length and 20 m (66 ft) in thickness, and together containing more than 74 million tonnes of barytes. The site was declared as a National Geological Monument by the Geological Survey of India in 1982. The site, owned and maintained by Andhra Pradesh Mineral Development Corporation, lies in an actively mined area and is vulnerable to mining.

== Geology ==
Baryte is naturally occurring form of barium sulfate mixed with other minerals such as quartz, calcite, and clay. The Mangampeta Barytes, considered to be one of the highest grade of barium sulfate, occurs in the Pullampeta Formation of the Nallamala Group of the Kadapa Supergroup.

The barytes deposits formed over time through the precipitation of volcanic vapours under submarine conditions, along with the sub-aerial showering of ash and molten baryte lapilli. In sulfate-poor, methane-rich sediments, the previously formed baryte was remobilised and carried by methane and barium-enriched fluids through hydrotectonic processes during the Palaeozoic period. These deposits were associated with the release of large amounts of barium and methane, which may have influenced the carbon cycle and climate during the period.
