= Barr Conglomerate =

Geological feature in Rajasthan

- Location within Rajasthan
- Coordinates: 26°4′28.8″N 74°6′10.8″E
- Location: Pali district, Rajasthan, India

National Geological Monuments of India
- Official name: Barr Conglomerate
- Designated: 1977
- Designated by: Geological Survey of India

Barr Conglomerate is a geological feature in Pali district of the Indian state of Rajasthan. It is a conglomerate composed of quartzite and rarely granite gneiss in a pelitic matrix. It was declared as a National Geological Monument by the Geological Survey of India in 1977.

== Geography and history ==
The geological feature is located near Barr village in Pali district, Rajasthan. It was declared as a National Geological Monument by the Geological Survey of India in 1977.

== Description ==
The pebbles range from 3.2–6.4 cm (1.3–2.5 in) and cobbles measure 6.4–25.6 cm (2.5–10.1 in) in thickness. The Barr conglomerate is unusual for its fairly uniform lithology and the exceptional stretching of its pebbles, which distinguishes it from typical conglomerates. The pebbles are remarkably flattened and elongated, with little fracturing. Their long axes are oriented along the foliation plane of the schist and the length measures 7–20 times their thickness.

== Geology ==
The pebbles are predominantly quartzite, with rare aplite, and are set in a matrix of fine-grained mica schist. The conglomerate rests unconformably on granite gneiss basement. It belongs to the Barr Formation of the Kumbhalgarh Group of the Delhi Supergroup.

The conglomerate was initially regarded as sedimentary, and the brittle rocks became pliable at high temperature and pressure. The subsequent deformation and folding transformed the horizontal beds into nearly vertical structures, while the minerals underwent metamorphism. These processes are considered to have occurred around 1.5 billion years ago, followed by uplift and weathering. Later studies noted the absence of a wide variety of cobbles typically expected in a conglomerate and interpreted the rock as autoclastic in origin. As per this, thin sandstone beds metamorphosed into quartzite, and were stretched and split into elongated pieces, which later developed into their present shapes under high pressure and temperature conditions.
