= Nepheline syenite, Kishangarh =

Geological formation in Rajasthan, India

- Location within Rajasthan
- Coordinates: 26°33′18.2″N 74°53′18.6″E
- Location: Kishangarh, Ajmer district, Rajasthan, India

National Geological Monuments of India
- Official name: Nepheline syenite, Kishangarh
- Designated: 1976
- Designated by: Geological Survey of India

The Nepheline syenite at Kishangarh is an igneous intrusion emplaced along the core of an antiform within the metamorphic rocks of the Aravalli Craton in Rajasthan, with an emplacement age of approximately 1.91 to 1.59 Ga. It was declared as a National Geological Monument by the Geological Survey of India in 1976.

== Geography ==
The geological formation is located at an altitude of 426 m (1,398 ft) near Kishangarh in Ajmer District, Rajasthan. It was declared as a National Geological Monument by the Geological Survey of India in 1976.

== Geology ==
The Nepheline syenite at Kishangarh is a rare igneous intrusion emplaced along the core of an antiform within the metamorphic rocks of the Aravalli Craton in Rajasthan. The intrusive pluton occurs within the Kishangarh Group, which consists of metavolcanic and sedimentary rocks of the Lower Aravalli Group of the Udaipur region. The Kishangarh Group overlies granite paragneiss, leucogranite, and minor amphibolite bodies, and is unconformably overlain by conglomerate, arkose, and quartzite of the Alwar Group of the Delhi Supergroup. The intrusion occurs near a prominent lineament associated with a fault and unconformity.

The nepheline syenite forms an elongated, flattened dome that has been refolded into a hook-shaped structure along the boundary of the Delhi Basin rocks. Strong shearing along the margins of the Delhi Basin provides evidence that the emplacement of these alkaline rocks took place between the formation of the Aravalli and Delhi sequences, indicating a post-Aravalli but pre-Delhi age of approximately 1.91–1.59 Ga.

The nepheline syenite is predominantly gneissic in appearance, contains mafic enclaves of varying sizes, and is cut by numerous dykes. Nepheline-bearing syenite is uncommon in India and is distinguished from granite, a silica-rich, coarse-grained igneous rock formed by slow cooling of lava at depth, by its lower silica content and the presence of feldspathoid minerals, particularly nepheline, a silica-undersaturated aluminosilicate containing sodium and potassium.
