= Sapthagiri =

Hill range in Andhra Pradesh, India

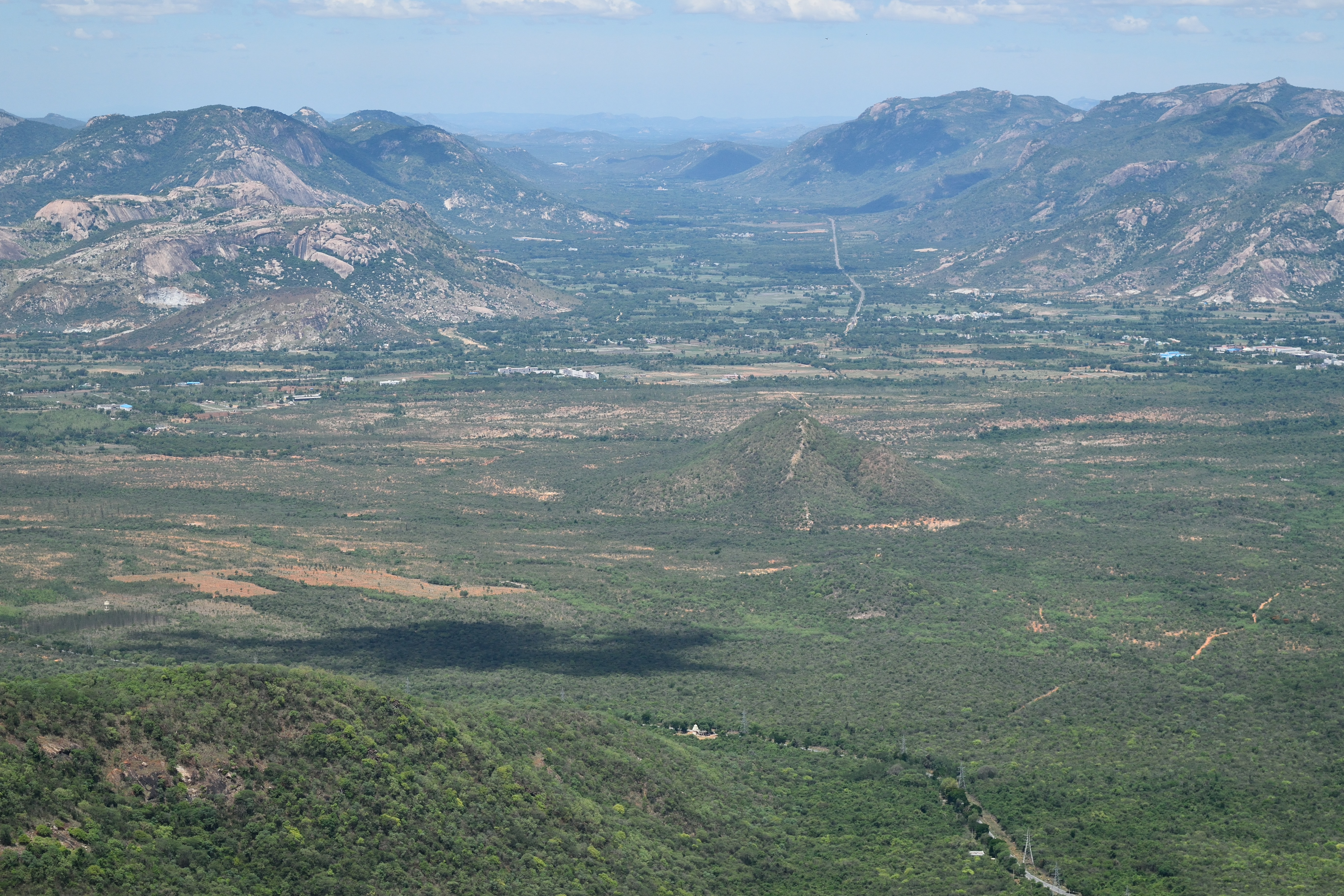
- Sapthagiri

Highest point
- Peak: Venkata
- Elevation: 980 m (3,220 ft)
- Coordinates: 13°40′59″N 79°20′49″E

Naming
- Etymology: Seven Hills
- Native name: Edukondalu (Telugu)

Geography
- Location within Andhra Pradesh Location within India
- Country: India
- State: Andhra Pradesh
- Rivers: Swarnamukhi
- Settlement: Tirupati

Sapthagiri (lit. 'seven hills'), is a hill range in the Seshachalam Hills of the Eastern Ghats in the Tirupati district of the Indian state of Andhra Pradesh. It comprises seven peaks including Venkatadri, which houses the renowned Venkateswara Temple at Tirumala.

== Geography ==
Sapthagiri is a hill range in the Seshachalam Hills of the Eastern Ghats in the Tirupati district of Andhra Pradesh. Spread over an area of 26.8 km^{2} (10.33 mi^{2}), the hills consists of seven peaks–Seshadri, Neeladri, Garudadri, Anjanadri, Vrushabhadri, Narayanadri, and Venkatadri, and the highest point is located about 980 m (3,220 ft) above sea level.

The hills are situated in the Seshachalam Hills biosphere and houses the Venkateswara National Park. The region features deciduous forests and is home to several endemic flora and fauna. The Venkateswara Temple at Tirumala, dedicated to Venkateswara, an avatar of the Hindu god Vishnu, is located atop Venkatadri. The temple rites were consecrated by Ramanuja in the 11th century, and was expanded by the Cholas, Pandyas, and the Vijayanagara Empire in the later Middle Ages.

== Geology ==
The Eparchaean Unconformity at Tirumala is declared as a National Geological Monument by the Geological Survey of India. It represents a meeting point in the geological history of the Earth where Archean gneisses formed over 2.5 billion years ago meet sedimentary rocks of the Proterozoic era of the Kadapa sub-group. The Silathoranam is a natural arch formation located in the hills. The 8 m (26 ft) tall and 3 m (9.8 ft) wide rock arch was formed by consistent erosion of the underlying quartzite rock, and is dated to more than 1.5 billion years old.

== Etymology ==
Sapthagiri literally means "seven hills" in Sanskrit, and represents the Saptarishi (seven seers) in Hindu mythology. The names of the seven hills are derived from Hindu mythology.

Hill	Named for	Notes
Vrushabhadri	Rishabha	Mount of Shiva
Anjanadri	Anjaneya	Son of Anjana
Neeladri	Niladevi	Consort of Vishnu
Garudadri	Garuda	Mount of Vishnu
Seshadri	Shesha	Dasa of Vishnu
Narayanadri	Narayana	Epithet of Vishnu
Venkatadri	Venkateswara	Form of Vishnu

== See also ==
- Sacred mountains
