= Welded Tuff, Jodhpur =

Geological formation in Rajasthan, India

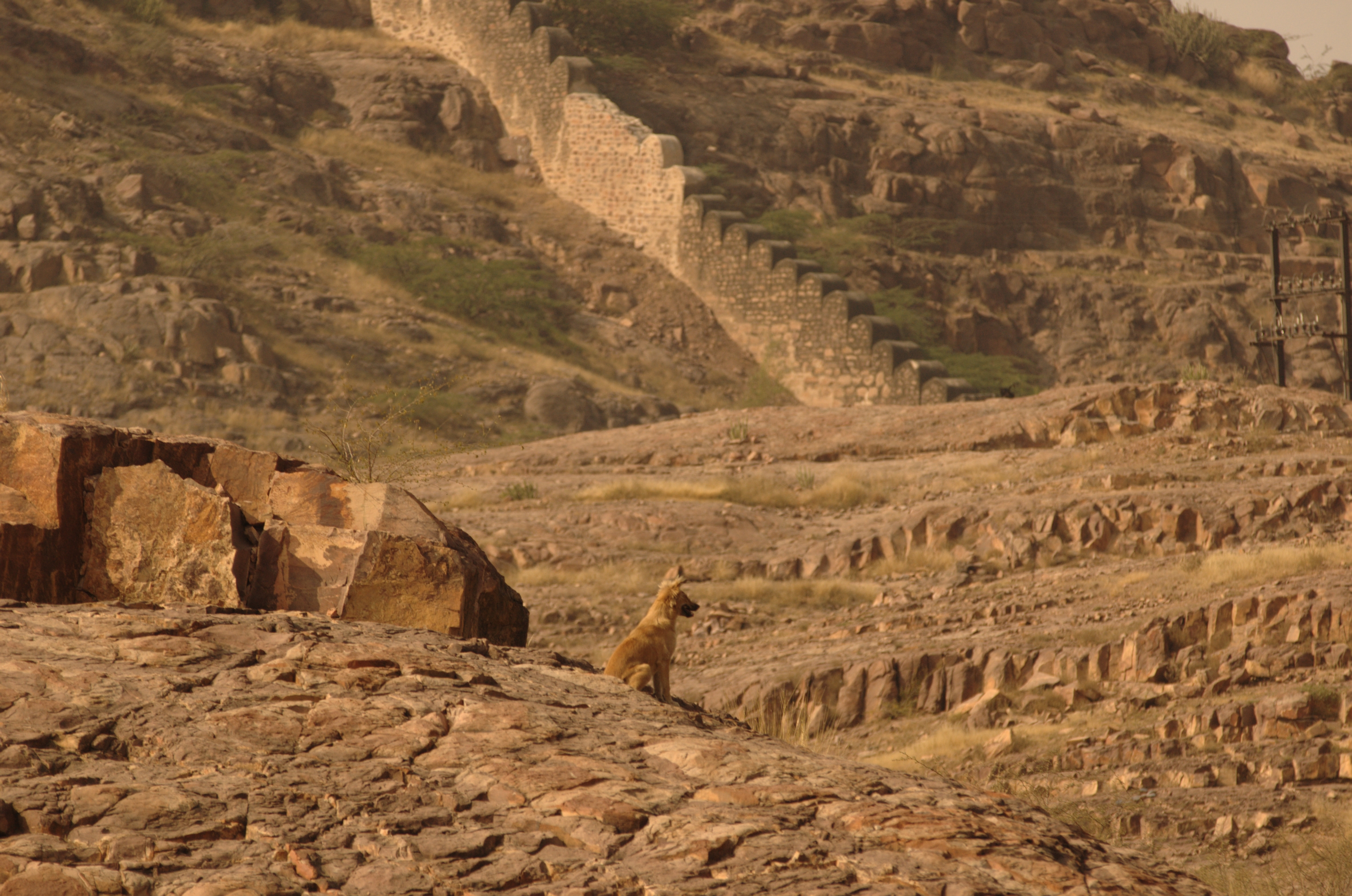

- Location within Rajasthan
- Coordinates: 26°18′9″N 73°1′13.7″E
- Location: Jodhpur district, Rajasthan, India

National Geological Monuments of India
- Official name: Welded Tuff, Jodhpur
- Designated: 1976
- Designated by: Geological Survey of India

Welded Tuffs are volcanic rocks exposed at the base of the hill on which Mehrangarh Fort is located, within the Rao Jodha Desert Rock Park in Jodhpur district, Rajasthan. It was notified as a National Geological Monument by the Geological Survey of India in 1976.

== Geography ==
The geological formation is located at the base of the hill on which Mehrangarh Fort is located, within the Rao Jodha Desert Rock Park in Jodhpur district, Rajasthan. It was declared as a National Geological Monument by the Geological Survey of India in 1976.

== Geology ==
In western Rajasthan, the geological formations include igneous rocks such as granite bosses and sills, formed from thick accumulations of acidic lava produced by volcanic activity that preceded the deposition of the overlying sedimentary rocks. The Malani Igneous Suite forms part of one of the world's largest exposures of silicic volcanic rocks, covering approximately 45,000 km^{2} (17,000 sq mi) to the west of the Aravalli Range across Western Rajasthan. These rocks consist of rhyolite, welded tuff, and ignimbrite that were produced by violent volcanic activity during the Late Precambrian, dating to around 750 Ma. The Mehrangarh Fort stands on a rhyolite rock exposure forming a hillock about 120 m (390 ft) high.

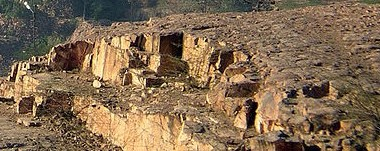
Terrace-like formations of the Malani igenous rocks

At the basement of the hill, the weathered and exposed Malani volcanic rocks exhibit terrace-like formations. These welded tuffs were formed from volcanic ejecta that spurted from volcanic vents and was transported through the air before settling. It is composed of glass, quartz, and feldspar. On cooling, the rocks developed joints that gave rise to characteristic terraces and columns. The Malani rhyolites occur in pink, maroon, brown, purple, grey and green colours and are separated by tuff, welded tuff, and pyroclastic rocks. The columnar joints are rectangular to hexagonal and attain lengths of up to 30 m (98 ft). The sequence is overlain by deep-purple porphyritic rhyolite.
