= Jhamarkotra Stromatolite Park =

- Interactive map of Jhamarkotra Stromatolite Park
- Location: Jhamarkotra, Udaipur district, Rajasthan, India
- Nearest city: Udaipur
- Coordinates: 24°28′29.7″N 73°52′2.3″E

National Geological Monuments of India
- Official name: Stromatolite Park, Jhamarkotra
- Designated: 1976
- Designated by: Geological Survey of India

Jhamarkotra Stromatolite Park is a paleontological site near Jhamarkotra in Udaipur district of the Indian state of Rajasthan. It was declared as a National Geological Monument by the Geological Survey of India in 1976.

== Geography ==
Jhamarkotra Stromatolite Park is situtated near Jhamarkotra in Udaipur district, Rajasthan. Located approximately 25 km (16 mi) from Udaipur, the site occupies a small hillock rising about 22 m (72 ft)above the surrounding terrain, at an elevation of approximately 490.9 m (1,611 ft) above sea level. The site was discovered in 1968, and was designated a National Geological Monument by the Geological Survey of India in 1976.

Much of the site remains inadequately protected. The phosphate-rich rocks have attracted mining interests, and although mining activity has exposed some stromatolitic structures, the absence of comprehensive safeguards have placed the geological features at risk of being damaged or destroyed. There have been calls for stronger protection of the site, alongside sustainable development and the promotion of geotourism.

== Geology ==
Jhamarkotra contains one of the largest known deposits of phosphorite associated with stromatolites. The stromatolites occur within Proterozoic dolomitic limestone of the Aravalli succession, dated to approximately 1.8 Ga. The park contains diverse stromatolites varying in shape and size, with characteristic "crocodile-skin" (locally known as "Magarmach Bhata") pattern produced by differential weathering of stromatolites and the surrounding material. The stromatolites site is notable for its exceptionally well-preserved evidence of ancient algal activity.

The association of phosphorite with stromatolites and their characteristic surface expressions is valuable for stratigraphic correlation and provides a useful guide for phosphate exploration in areas with similar lithological associations. Features such as stromatolite growth approximately perpendicular to bedding and their convexity towards the top also provide important field evidence for determining the original orientation of strata and interpreting geological structures. Several varieties of phosphorite occur at Jhamarkotra, including laminated, columnar, fragmental, brecciated, vesicular, botryoidal, and loose or powdery types.

Stratiform stromatolites are particularly well exposed in Block H, (Note: Blocks A to H indicate the various regional synclines that contain the Paleoproterozoic phosphorite layers of the Aravalli Supergroup.) where they occur as interbedded laminae. In high-grade phosphorite, brecciated stromatolitic fragments are commonly welded within a calcareous and cherty matrix. These features have been interpreted as the result of tectonic brecciation followed by leaching and recrystallisation of detrital stromatolitic material, processes that may have upgraded initially low-grade phosphate ore. In low-grade phosphorite, the stromatolitic structures are generally better preserved and occur with an intervening carbonate matrix.
