= Bhojunda Stromatolite Park =

- Interactive map of Bhojunda Stromatolite Park
- Location: Bhojunda, Chittaurgarh district, Rajasthan, India
- Nearest city: Chittaurgarh
- Coordinates: 24°50′20.5″N 74°35′00.8″E
- Area: 8 acres (3.2 ha)

National Geological Monuments of India
- Official name: Stromatolite Park, Bhojunda
- Designated: 1976
- Designated by: Geological Survey of India

Bhojunda Stromatolite Park is a protected paleontological site near Bhojunda in Chittaurgarh district of the Indian state of Rajasthan. It is spread across 8 acres (3.2 ha) on either side of the Chittaurgarh–Udaipur highway. It was declared as a National Geological Monument by the Geological Survey of India in 1976.

== Geology ==
Bhojunda stromatolite is an exposure within the Bhagwanpura limestone of the Lower Vindhyan Age. The Vindhyan Formations are about 900 Ma old. They are formed by blue-green algae which form a mat by attracting and bonding carbonate particles through their filaments into stratiform, columnar and nodular structures in carbonate rocks. Stromatolites are considered evidence of some of the earliest forms of life on Earth and are formed by a combination of life activity, sediment trapping and binding activity of algae and bacteria. They generally develop in shallow-water environments where tidal activity continuously brings sedimentary material. Their discovery in rocks older than the Vindhyan Formations provided important evidence for the existence of life in the Precambrian rocks of Rajasthan.
