= Rao Jodha Desert Rock Park =

Park in Jodhpur, India

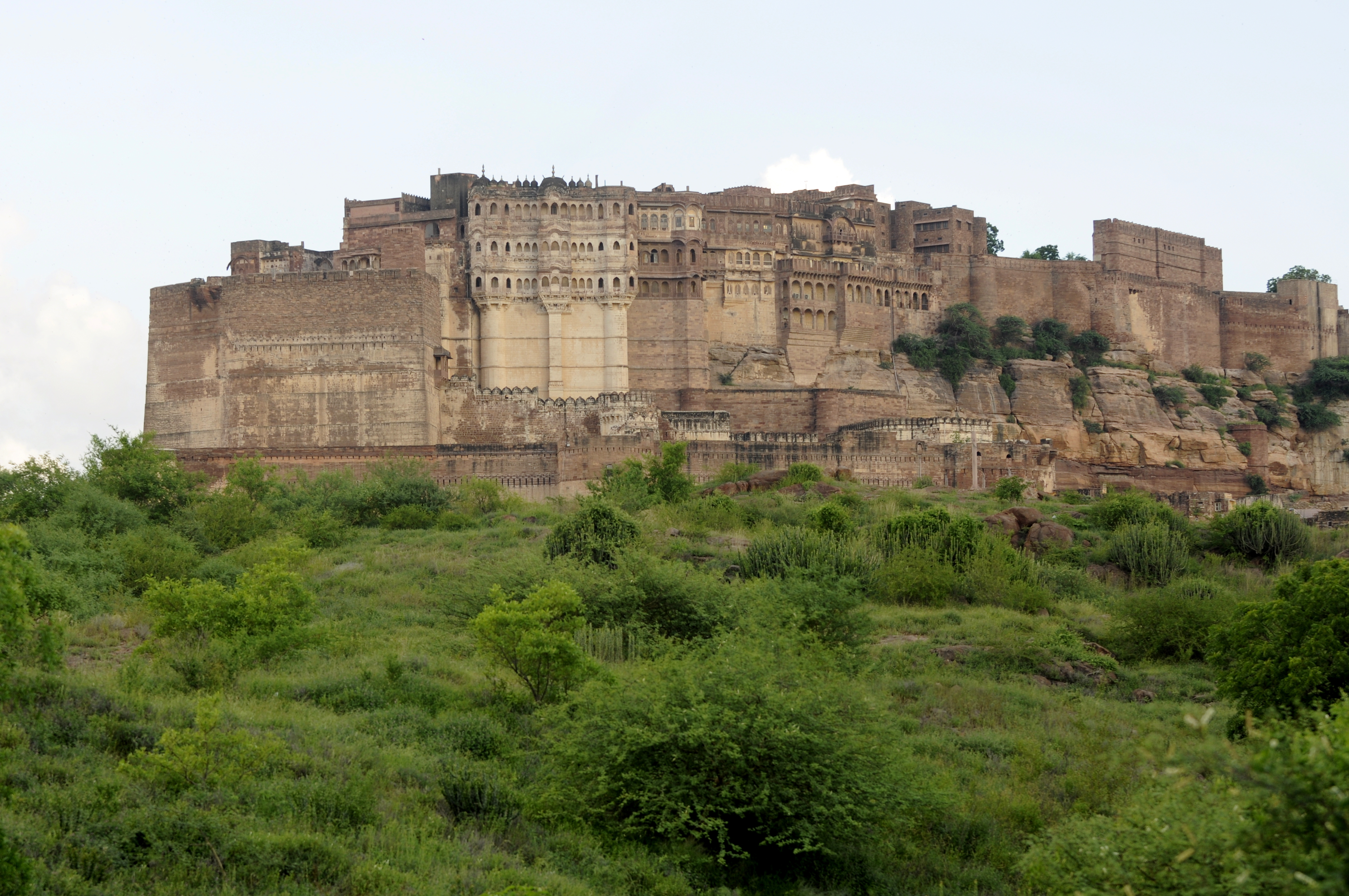
- Mehrangarh Fort above Rao Jodha Desert Rock Park
- Interactive map of Rao Jodha Desert Rock Park
- Type: Natural Area
- Location: Jodhpur, Rajasthan
- Nearest city: Jodhpur
- Coordinates: 26.304611°N 73.016853°E
- Area: 70 hectares
- Created: 2006
- Operator: Mehrangarh Museum Trust
- Visitors: +919571271000
- Open: 7:00am-6:30pm (in summer), 8:00am-5:30pm (in winter)
- Status: Open

Rao Jodha Desert Rock Park, spreads over 72 hectares, near the historic Mehrangarh Fort in Jodhpur, Rajasthan, India. The park contains ecologically restored desert and arid land vegetation. The park was created in 2006 to try and restore the natural ecology of a large, rocky area adjoining and below the fort. It was opened to the public in February 2011. The area in and around the park contains distinctive volcanic rock and sandstone formations. The park includes a Visitors Centre with Interpretation Gallery, a native plant nursery, small shop and cafe. There are four trails (yellow, green, red, and blue trails), about 880 m to 1115 m long, that visitors can take and trained guides and naturalists are also available.

== Jodhpur Welded Tuff ==
Jodhpur Welded Tuff here has been declared the National Geological Monuments of India by the Geological Survey of India (GSI), for their protection, maintenance, promotion and enhancement of geotourism. The volcanic rocks at Rao Jodha Desert Rock Park were formed somewhere between 745 and 680 million years ago. The volcanic formations are chiefly rhyolite, with welded tuff, and breccia found in some areas. There is a gully passing through the park (an old aqueduct or canal to carry rainwater from a wider catchment in the north to Padamsar lake at the base of the fort), where breccia is visible today. Also seen are rocks with large to intermediate crystal sizes and from fine textured tuff to large-grained (porphyritic) rhyolite.

== Plant and animal life ==
The park has around 250 species of native plants, including a large number of arid region lithophytes. Some of the common plants include trees such as Rohido (Tecomella undulata), Kumatiyo (Acacia senegal), Hingoto (Balanites roxburghii), Peeloo (Salvadora persica), Kharo Jaal (Salvadora oleoides), Sargooro (Moringa concanensis), Goondi (Cordia sinensis), and Bordi (Ziziphus nummularia). Among shrubs, the leafless spurge or Thhor (Euphorbia caducifolia) is one of the common succulents. Other shrubs include Bui (Aerva javanica), Aakado (Calotropis procera), Kair (Capparis decidua), Ghatbor (Fleuggia leucopyrus), Kheer Kheemp (Sarcostemma acidum), Kheemp (Leptadenia pyrotechnica), and Googal (Commiphora wightii).

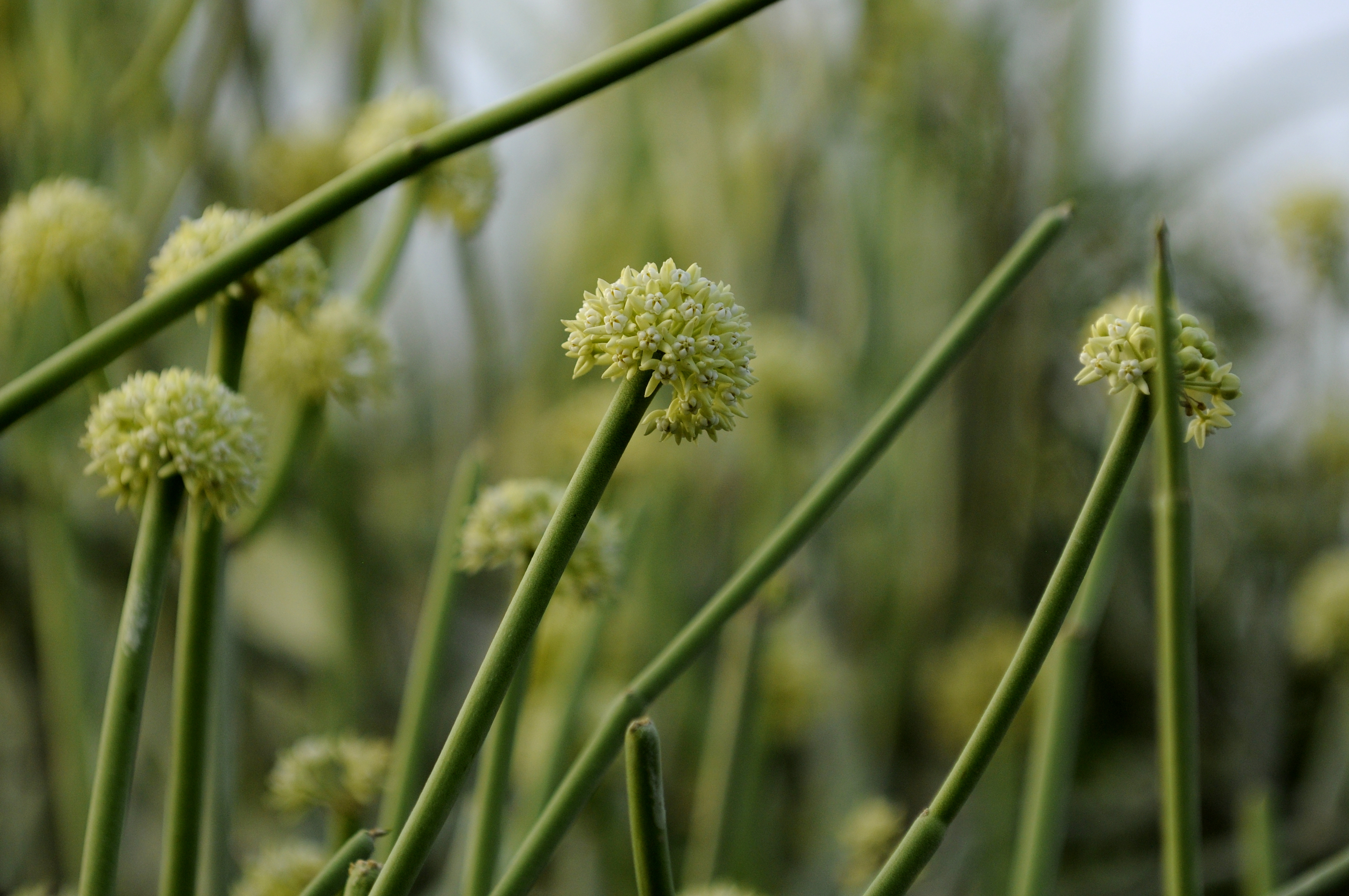
Sarcostemma acidum flowering

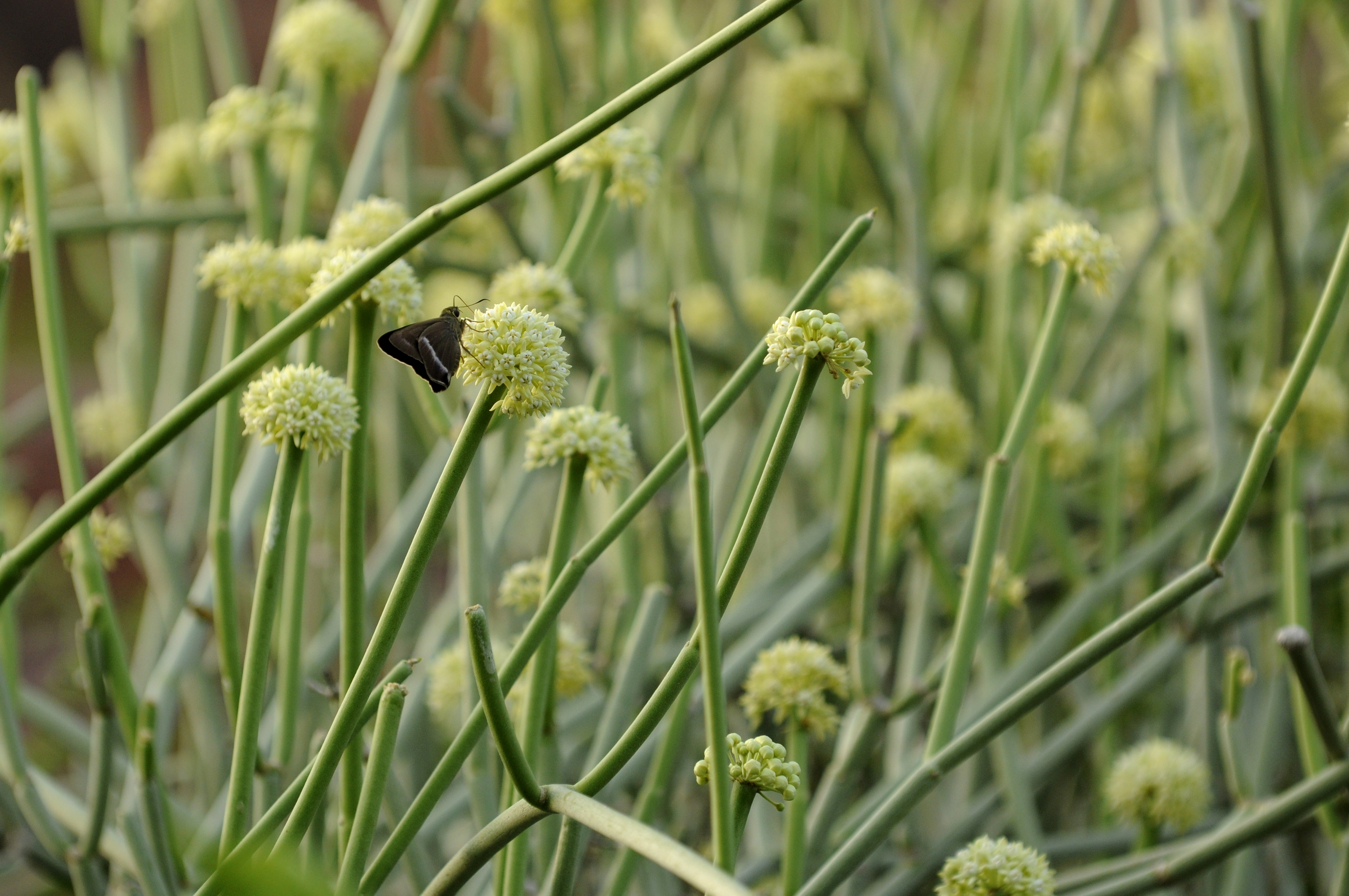
Common banded awl butterfly on Sarcostemma acidum flowers

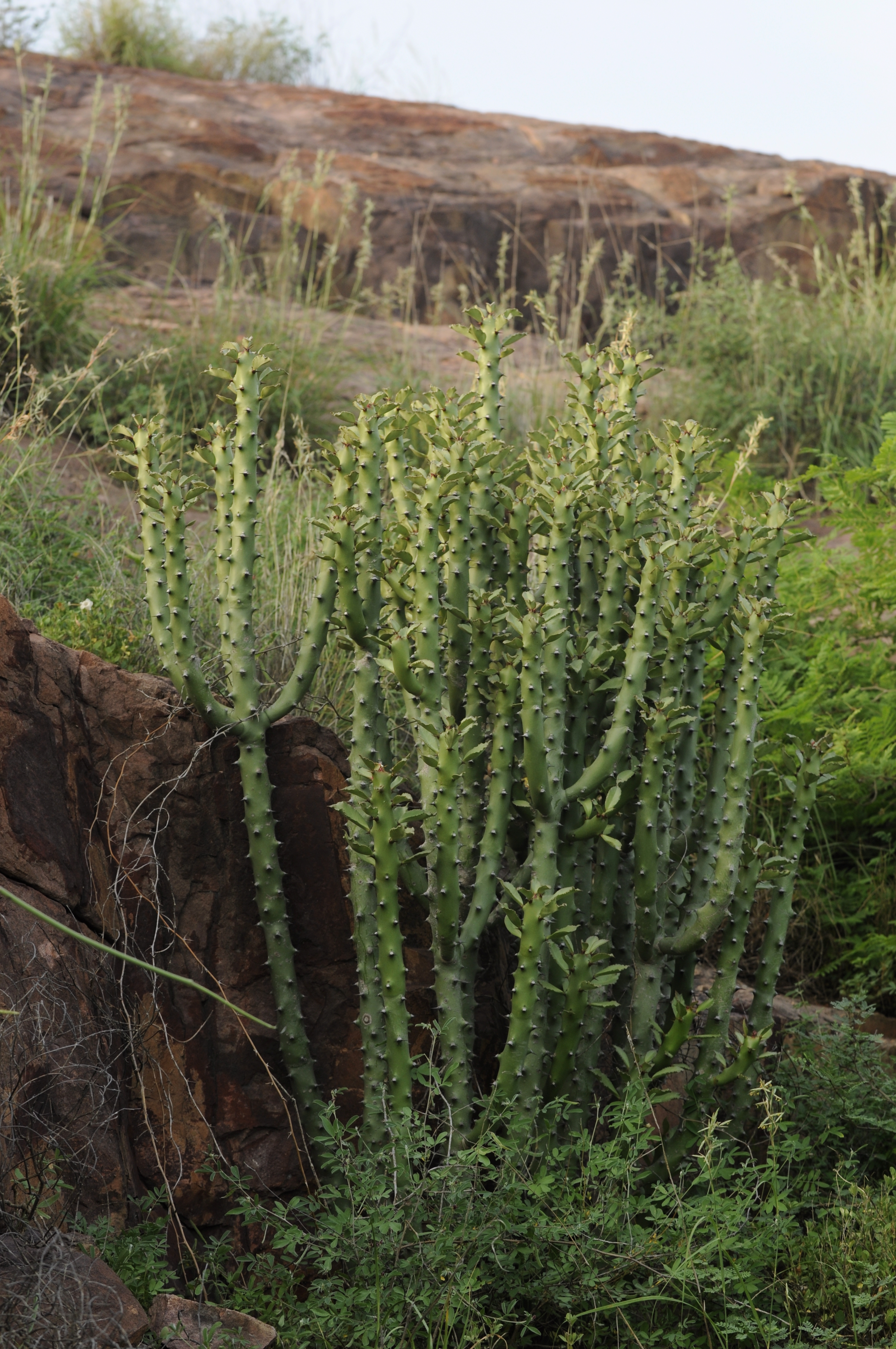
Euphorbia caducifolia growing in rocky area

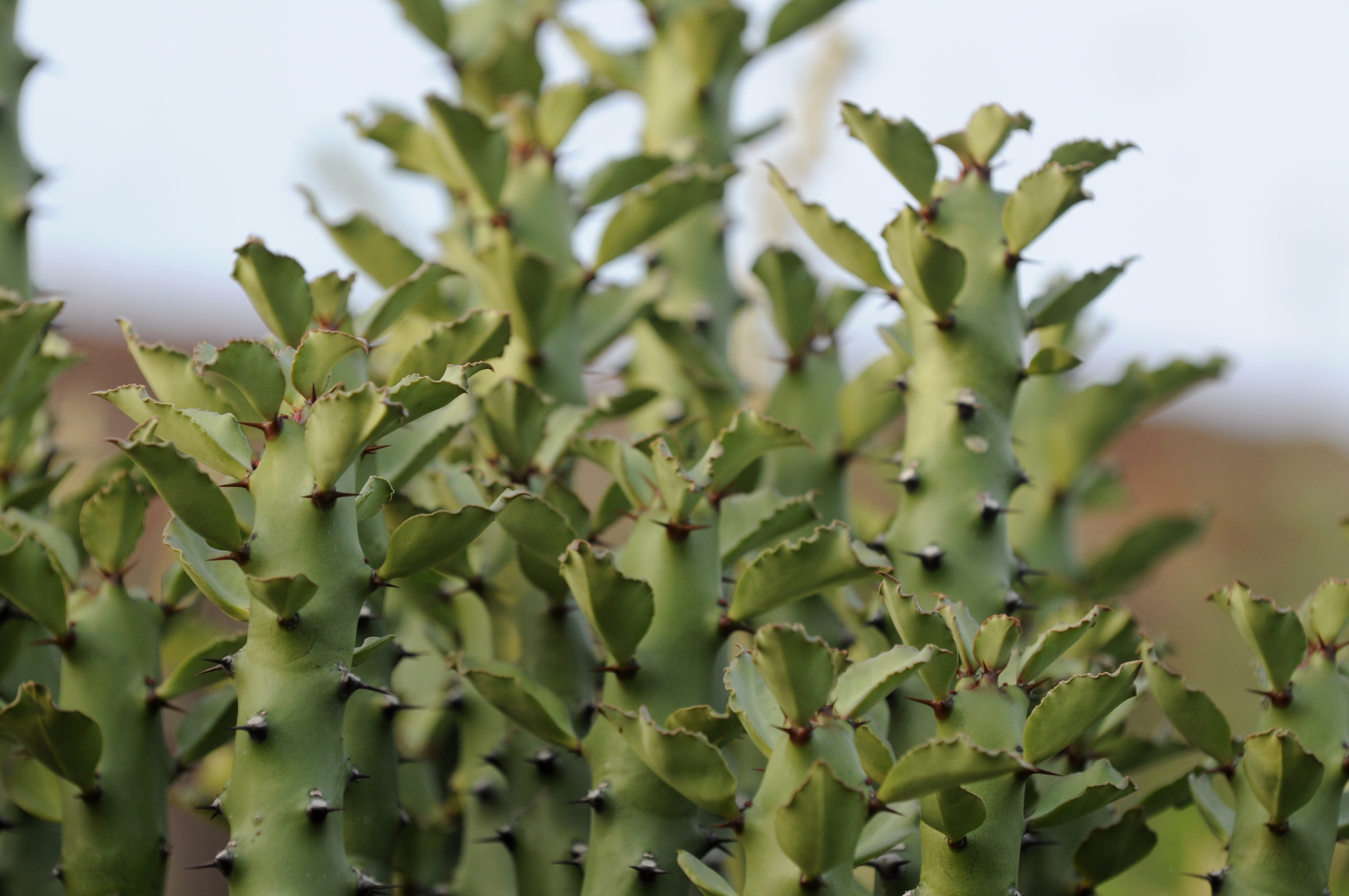
Euphorbia caducifolia close up

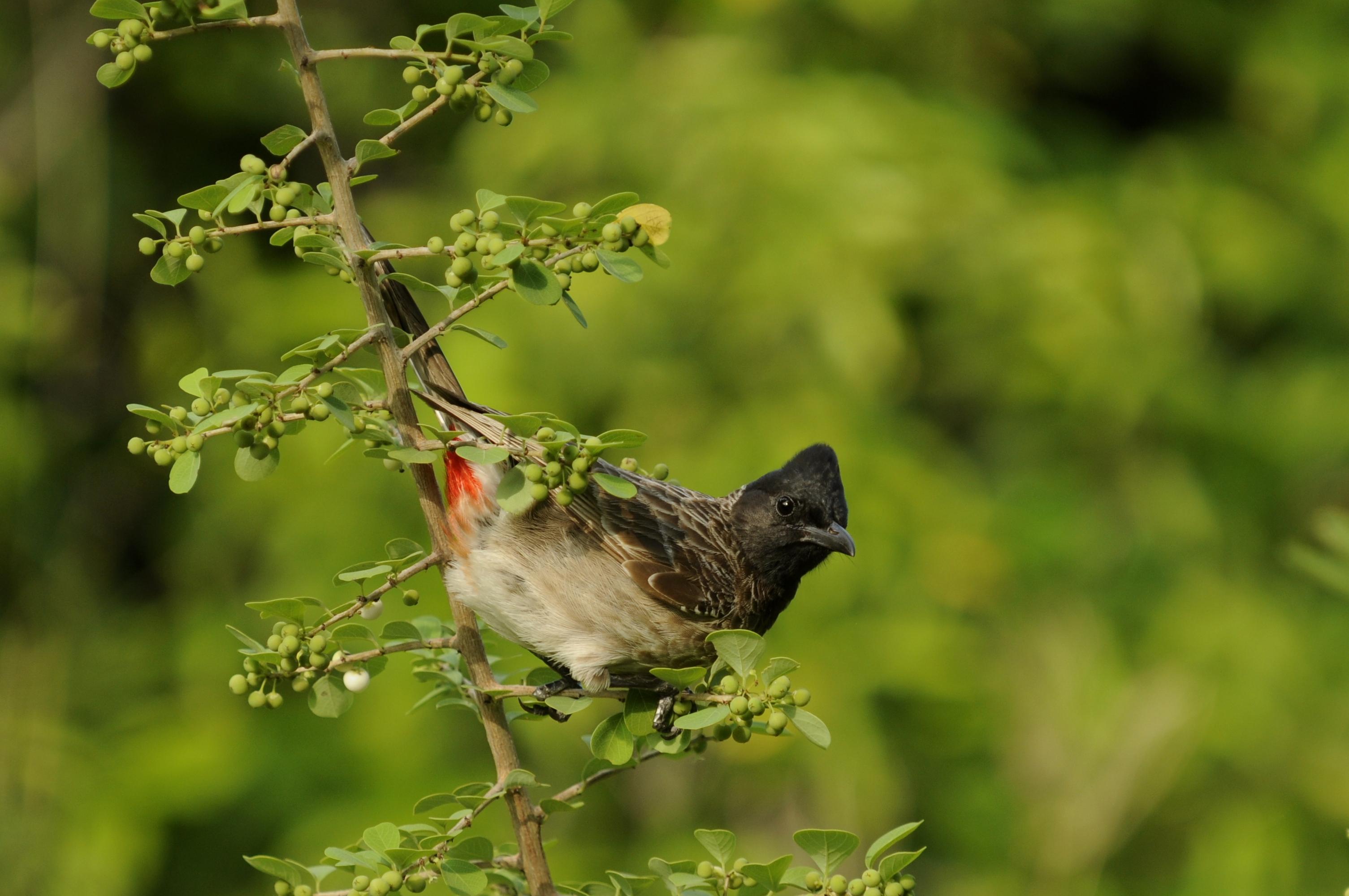
Red-vented Bulbul on fruiting Fleuggia leucopyrus

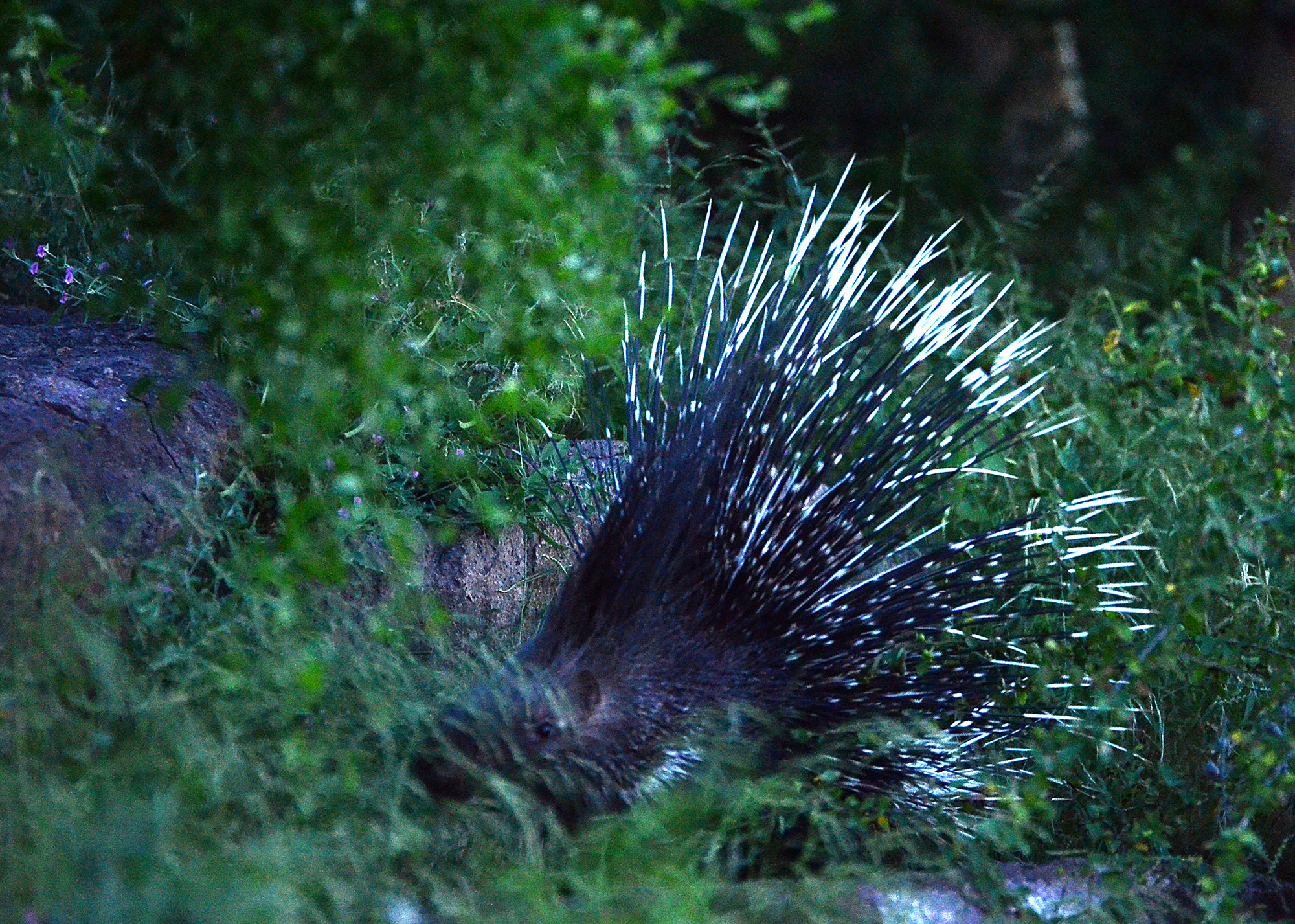
Indian crested porcupine Rao Jodha Jodhpur Rajasthan

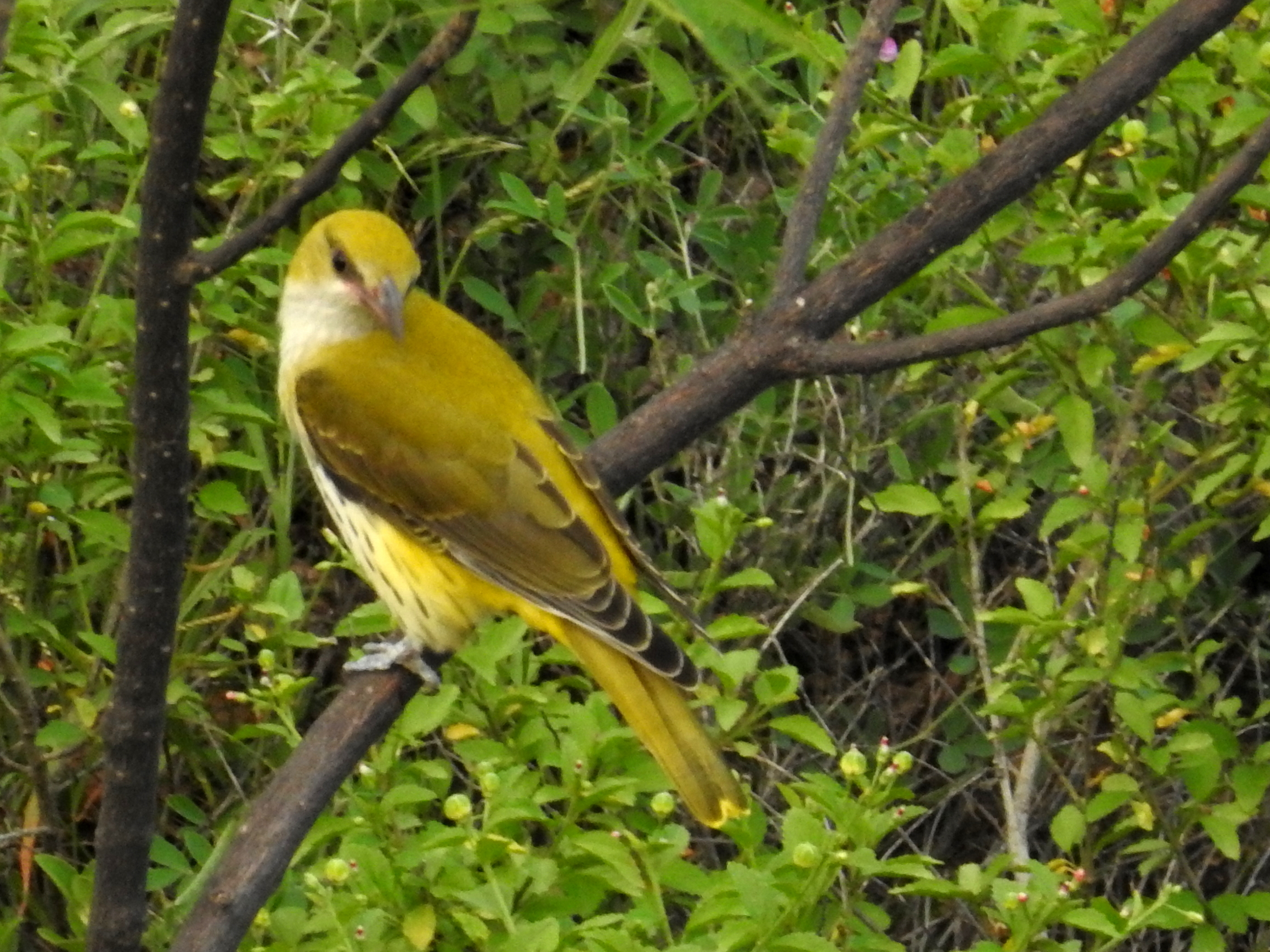
Female Indian Golden Oriole

The park has several reptile species and over 200 species of birds and is an eBird hotspot. Mammals include free-ranging dogs, Indian crested porcupine, and northern or five-striped palm squirrel.

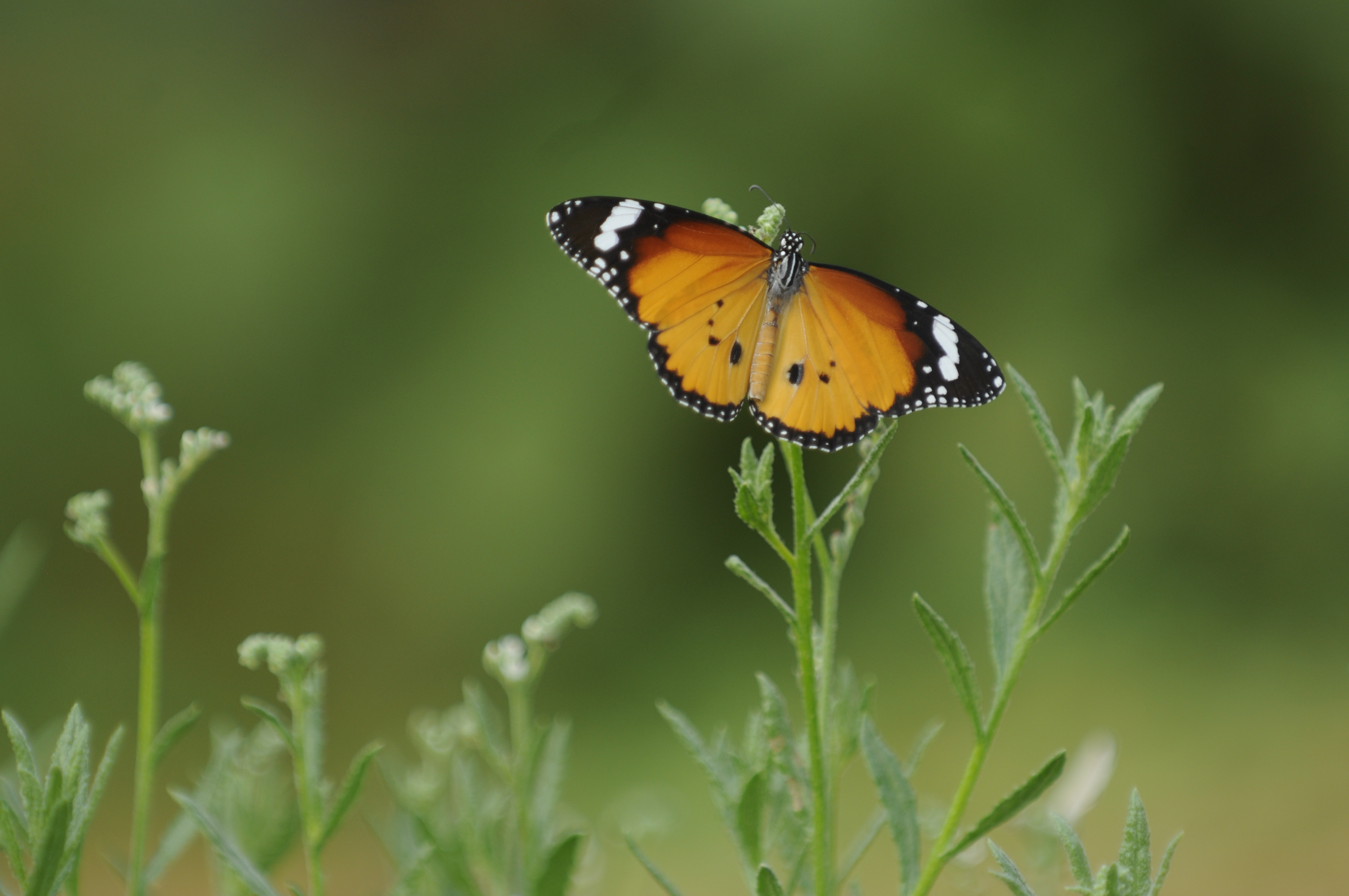
Plain Tiger butterfly in Rao Jodha Desert Rock Park

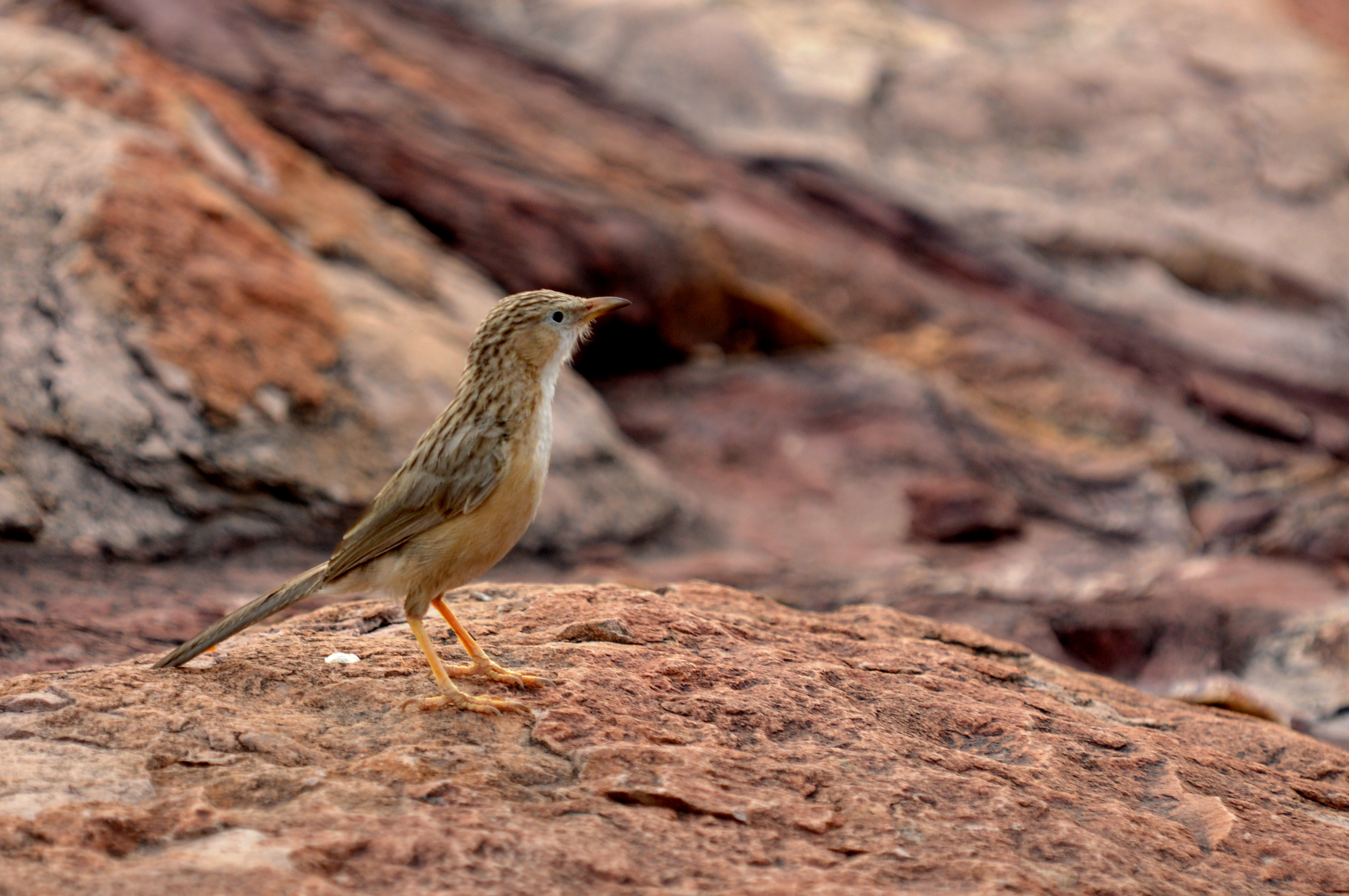
Common Babbler on the rocks

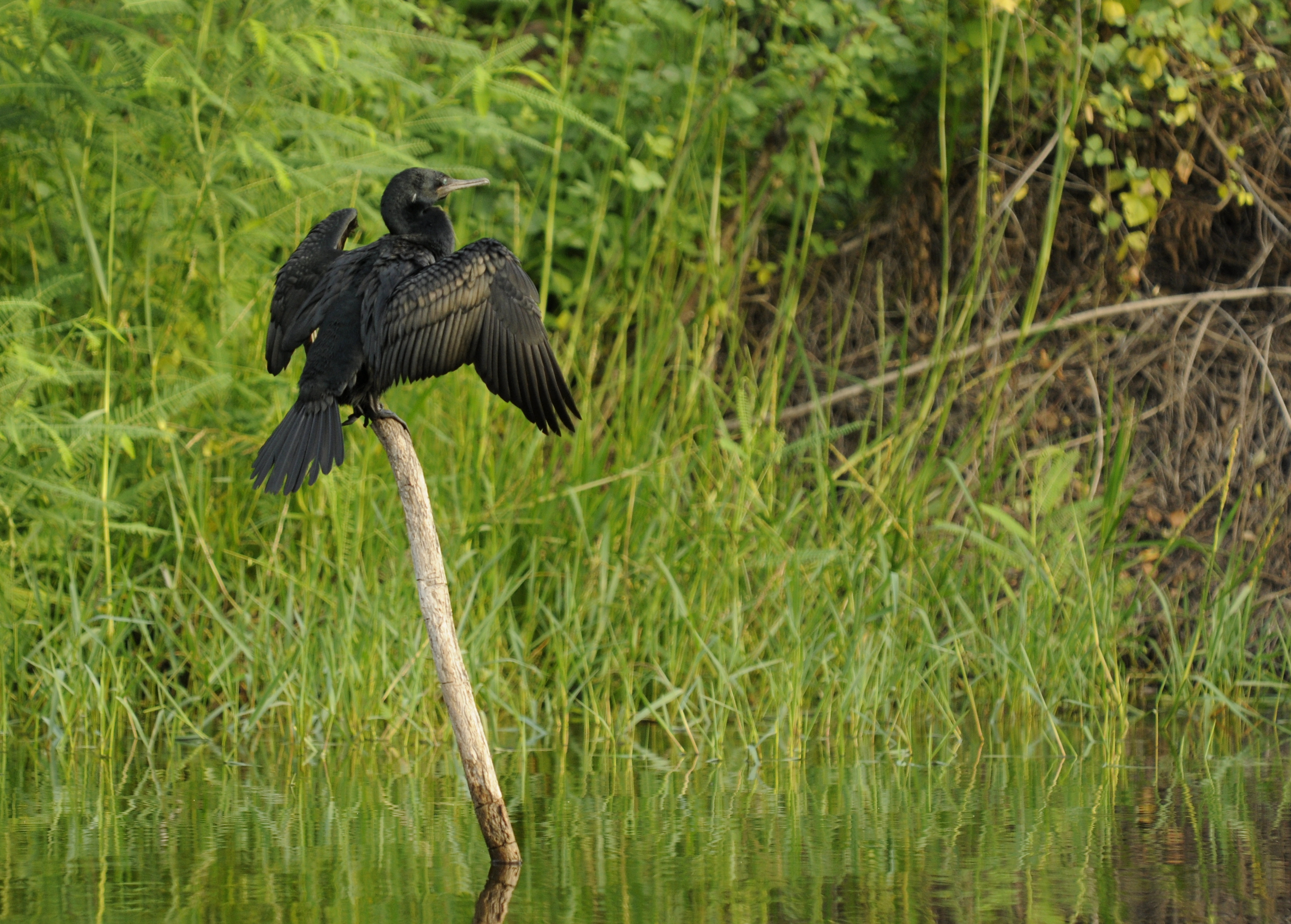
Indian Cormorant at lake in Jaswant Thada

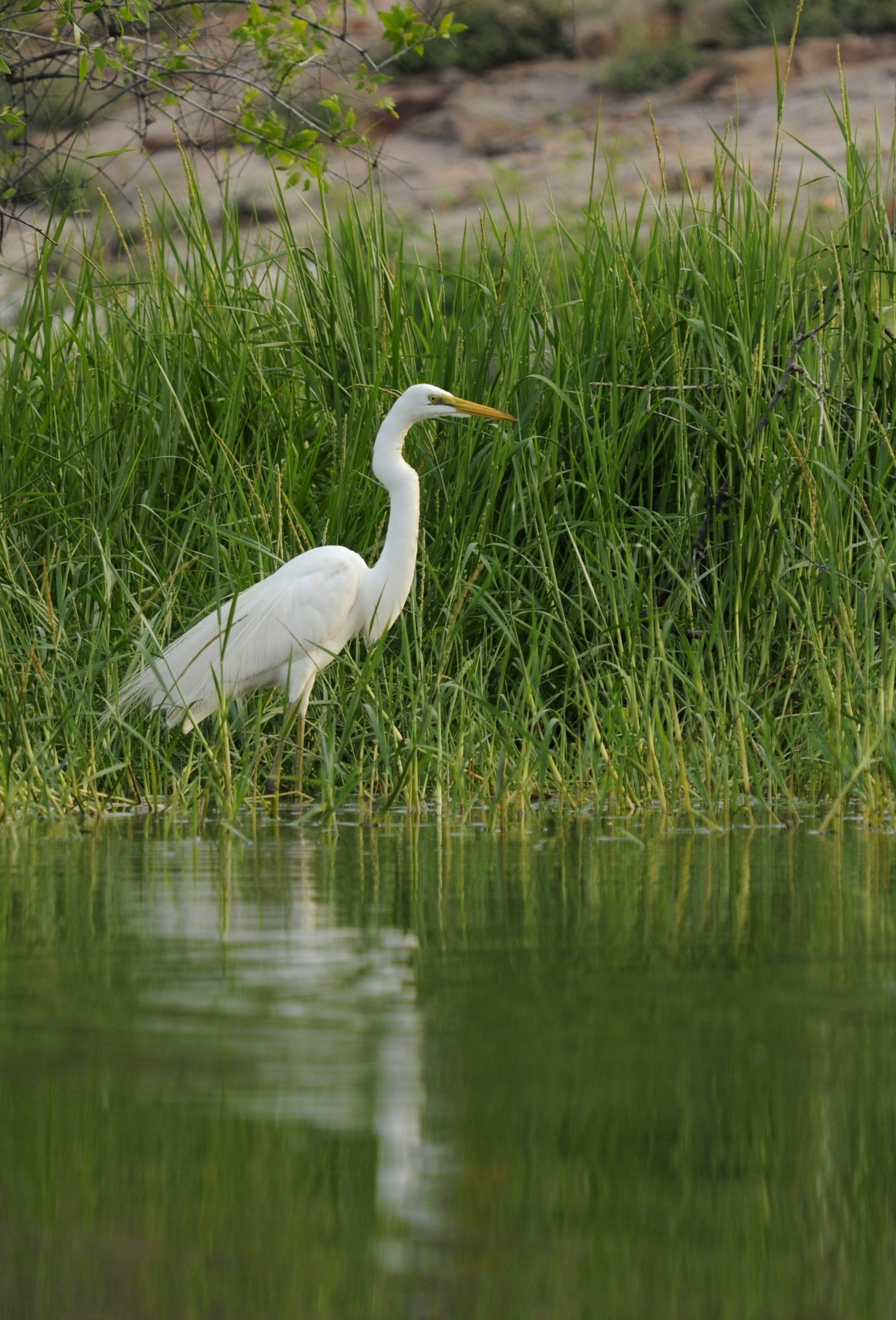
Great Egret in lake at Jaswant Thada

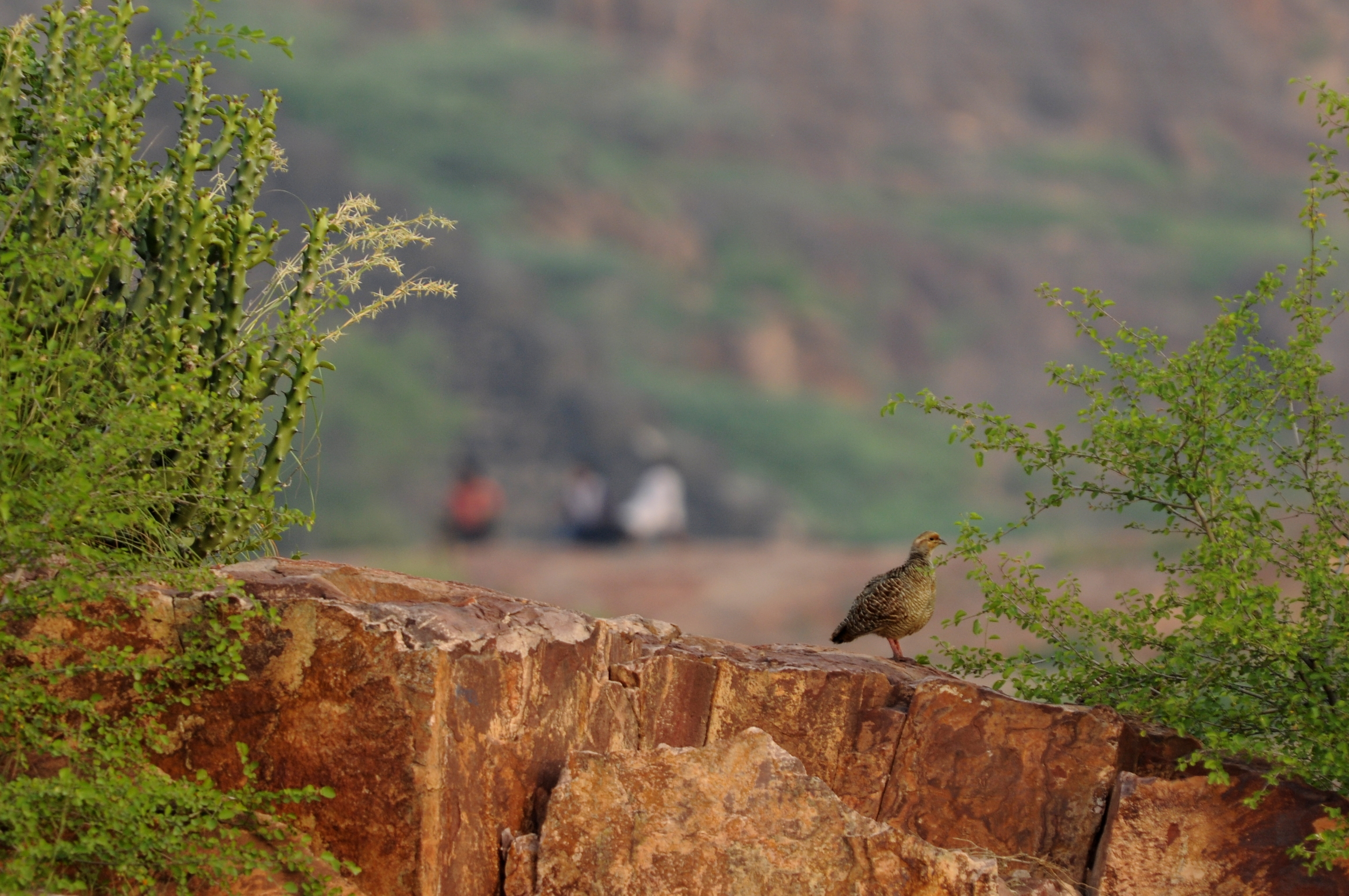
Grey Francolin amidst rocks and desert vegetation

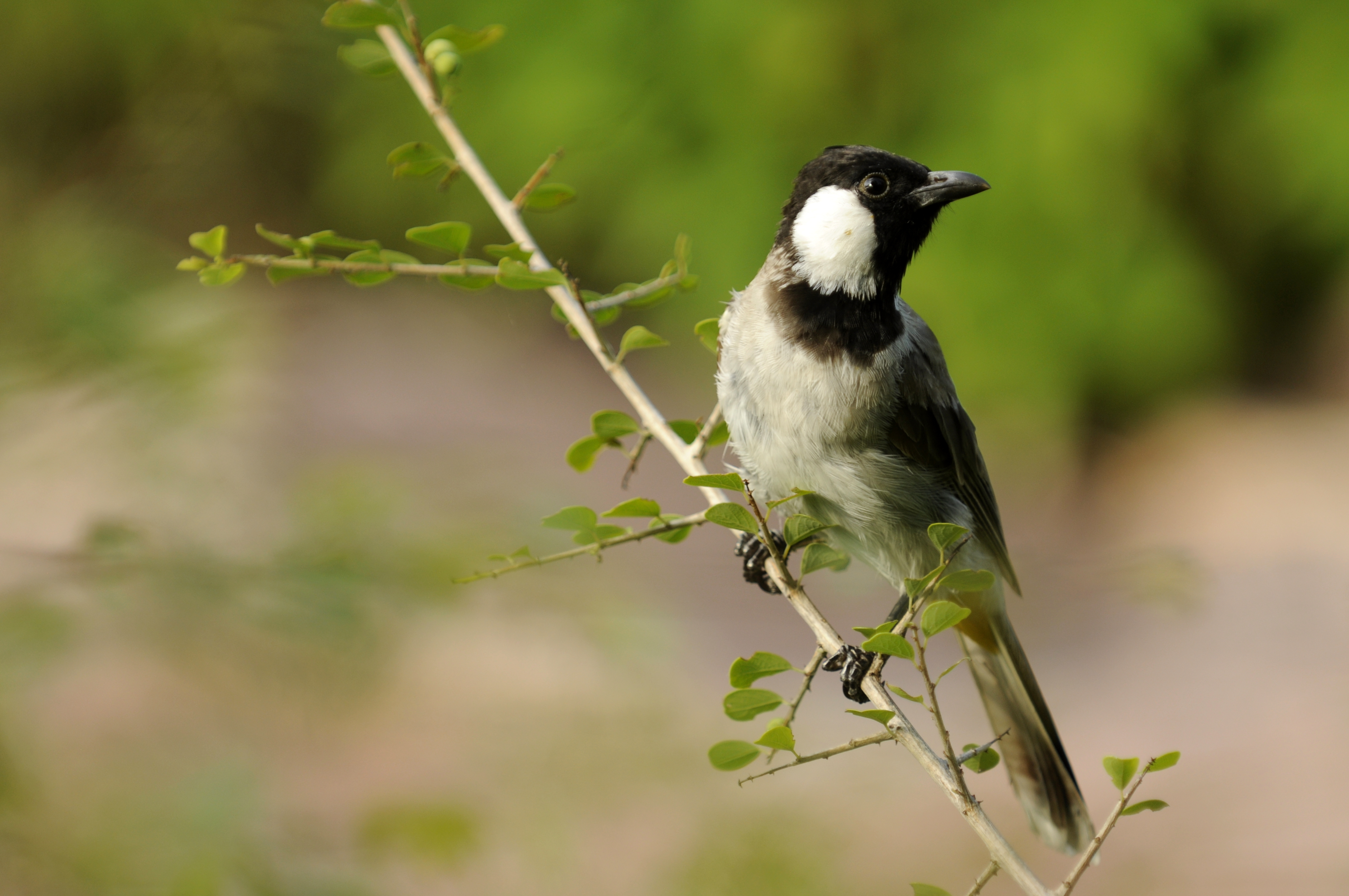
White-eared Bulbul on Fleuggea leucopyrus

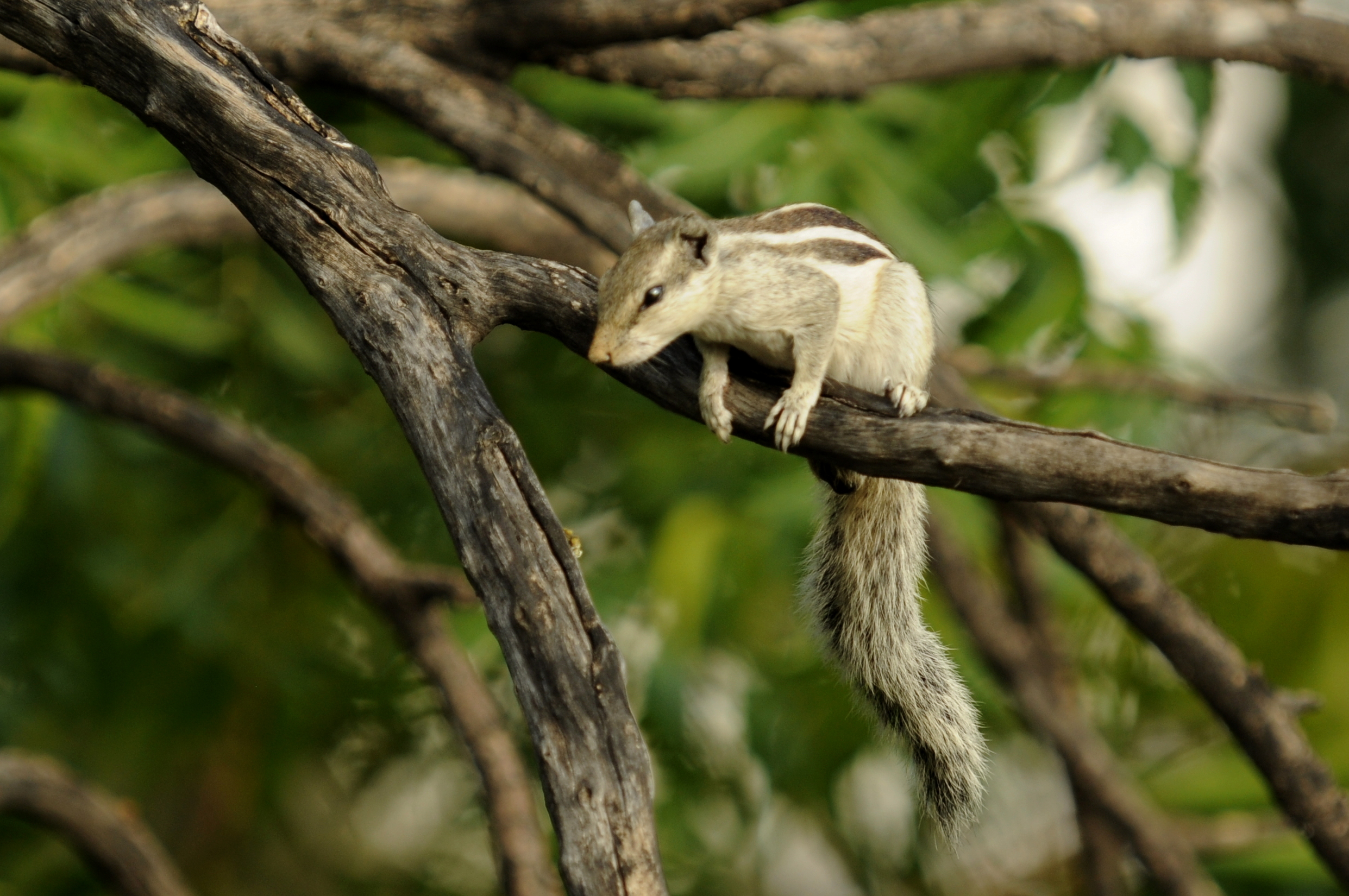
Five-striped or northern palm squirrel in Rao Jodha

== Restoration ==
The Rao Jodha Desert Rock Park has attempted both architectural and ecological restoration. The Visitors Centre is housed in Singhoria Pol, a 17th-century gateway into Jodhpur city, which had fallen into ruins and disrepair. The gateway was restored and the Visitors Centre, completed in February 2011, has an Interpretation Gallery about the desert, plants, and history, integrated into the passages and rooms over and around the gate. The historic city wall that had crumbled in places was also restored, which assisted in protecting the area from grazing livestock during ecological restoration.

Ecological restoration was carried out to remove invasive alien plants and bring back the original desert and arid land vegetation of the region. The park area was earlier overrun by Prosopis juliflora (local name baavlia), an invasive, thorny shrub introduced from Central America almost a century ago. The Prosopis juliflora was carefully removed from the volcanic rocks with the help of local Khandwaliya people, expert in rock chiseling. The park now has around 250 species of native plants. A small 'xeriscape' or 'Xeri garden' at the Visitor's Centre has been created to display a range of xeric and rocky microhabitats, each with several characteristic native plant species. The restoration or rewilding project has been spearheaded by Pradip Krishen, a filmmaker who renounced filmmaking due to corruption in the Industry. Mr. Krishen turned to gardening and environmental conservation, serving in this way to rejuvenate the deteriorating Indian landscape and its people.

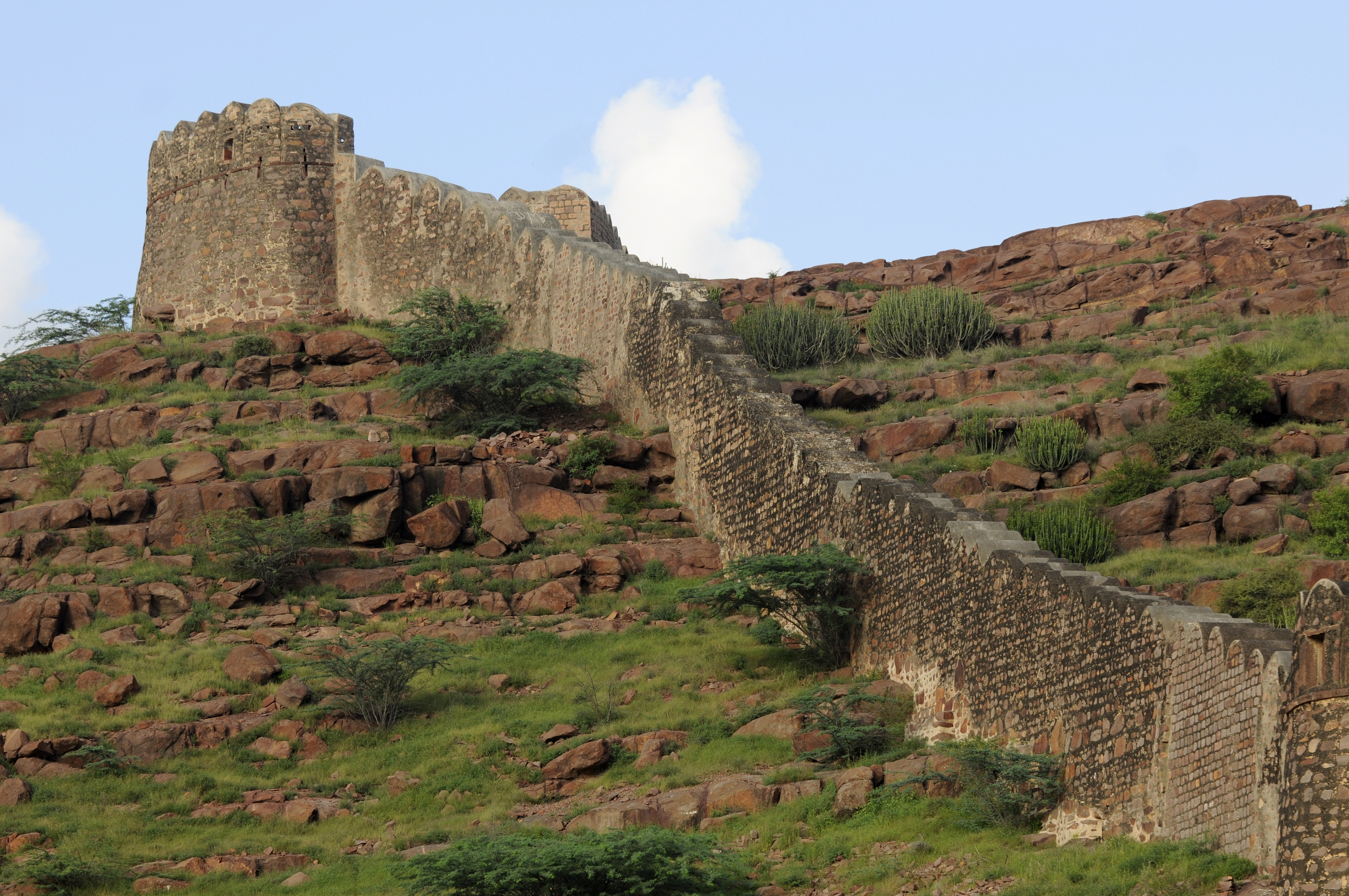
Ecologically restored desert vegetation with Euphorbia caducifolia and other native plants (right of wall), and unrestored area invaded by alien Prosopis julifora shrubs (on left of wall).

== Native Plants Nursery ==
The park has a native plants nursery where native rock-loving and arid region plants are propagated from seeds and cuttings. The nursery is located near the 'piao' or public drinking water station on the way down from the fort. The seedlings raised here are planted out for ecological restoration of the park area each year around the monsoon. Over 80 native plant species have been raised and planted out in the park.

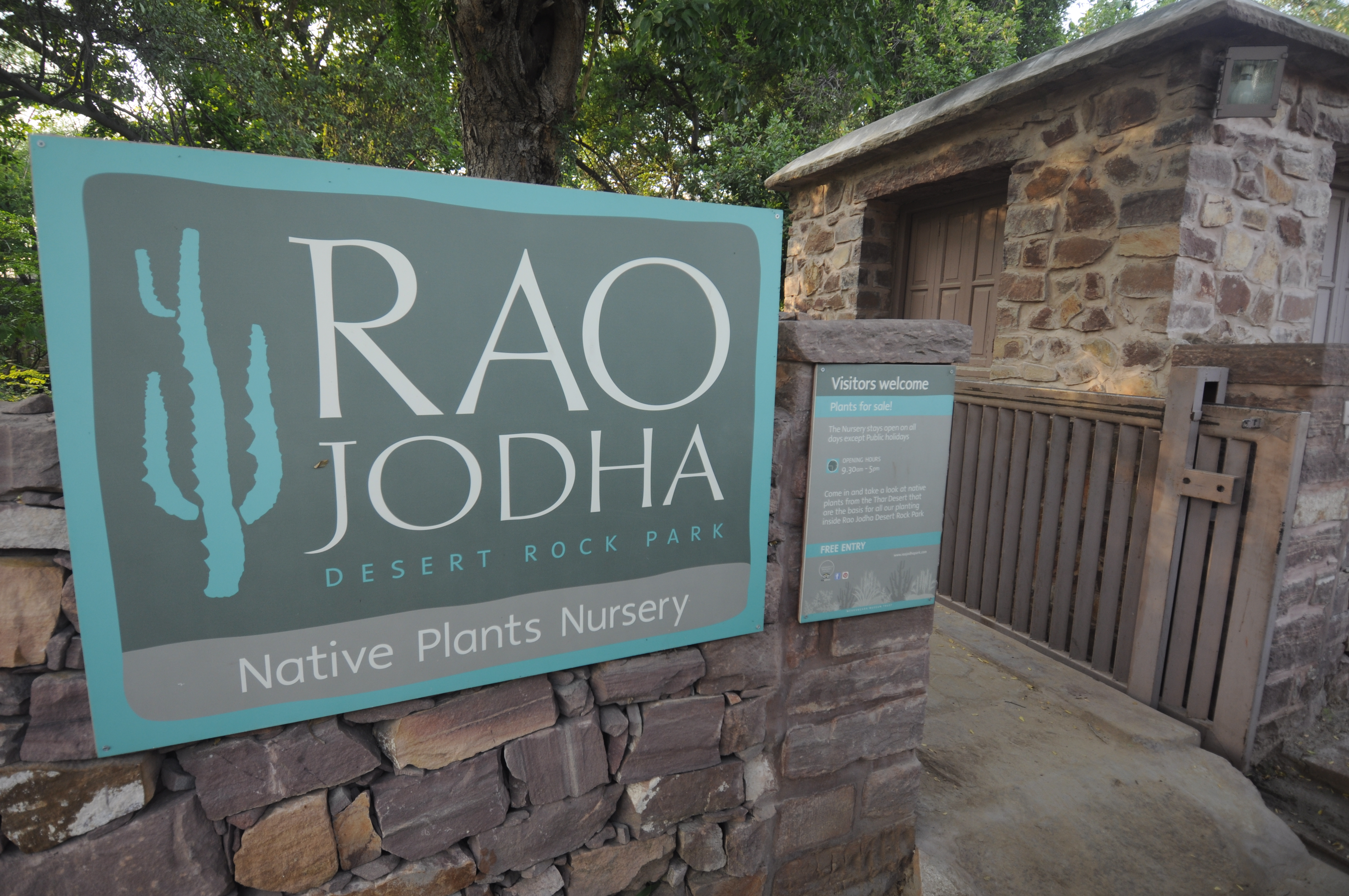
Entrance to the Native Plants Nursery, Rao Jodha Desert ROck Park

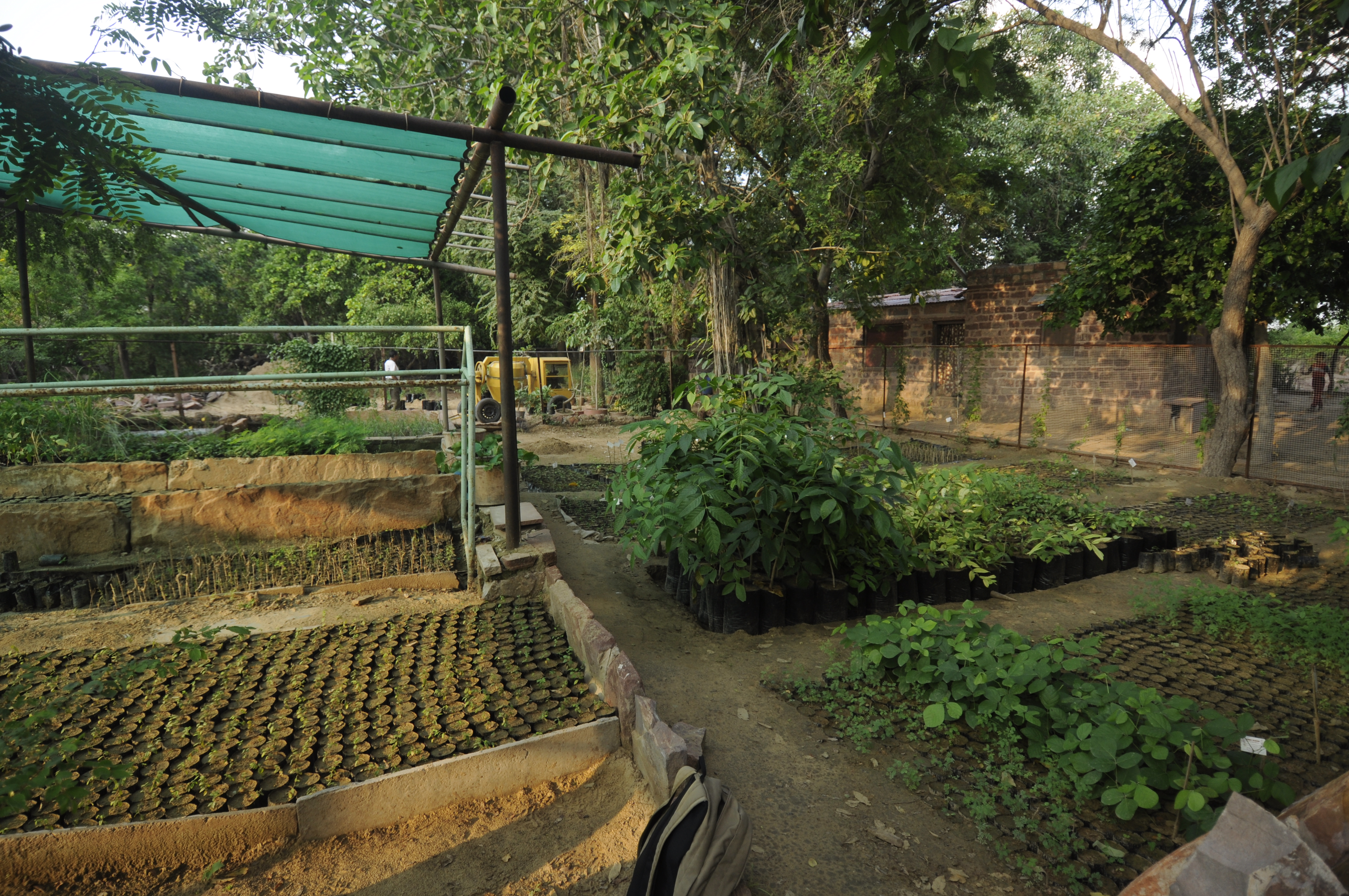
View of native plants nursery at Rao Jodha Desert Rock Park

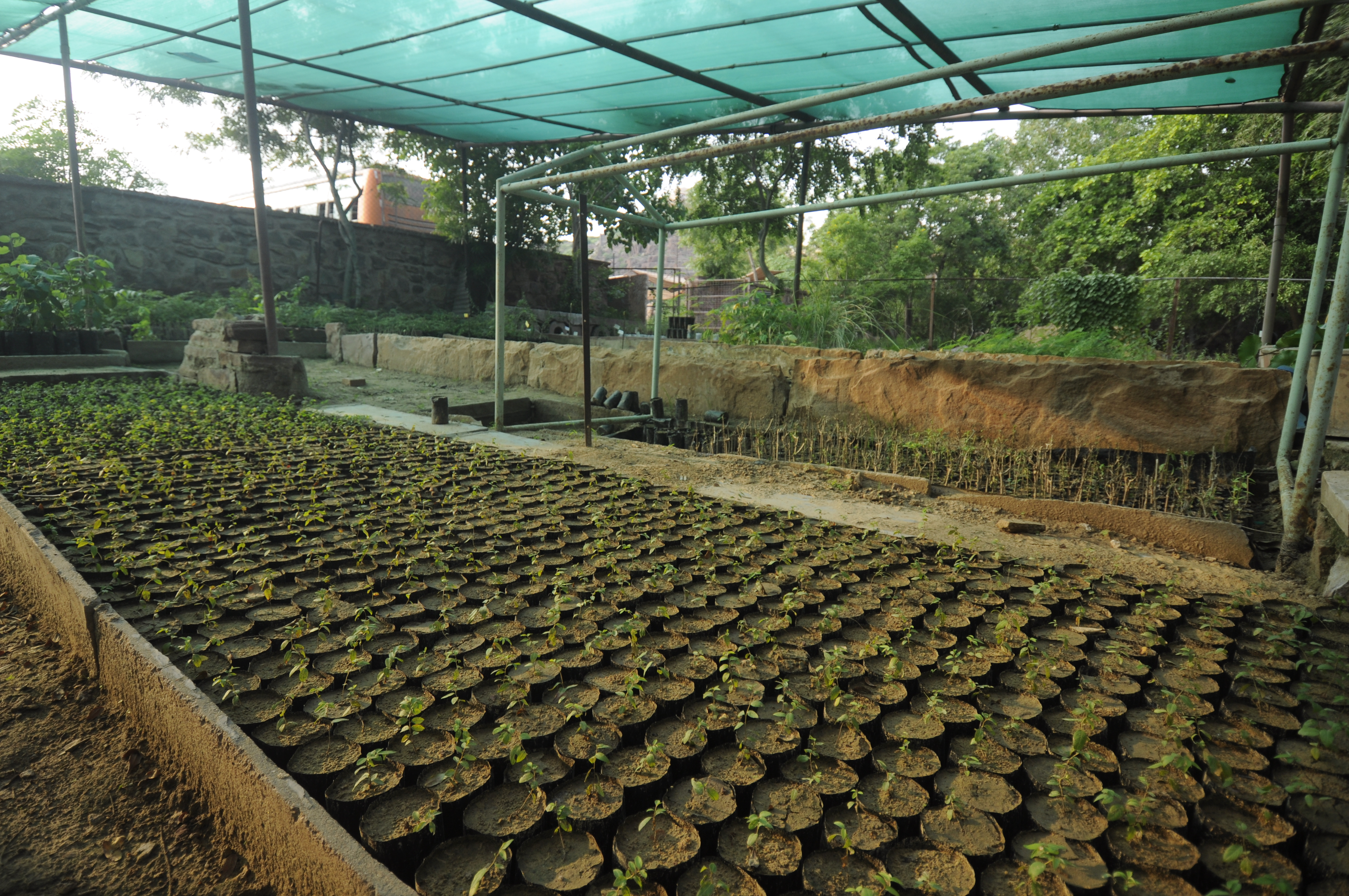
Seedlings being raised in polybags under shade

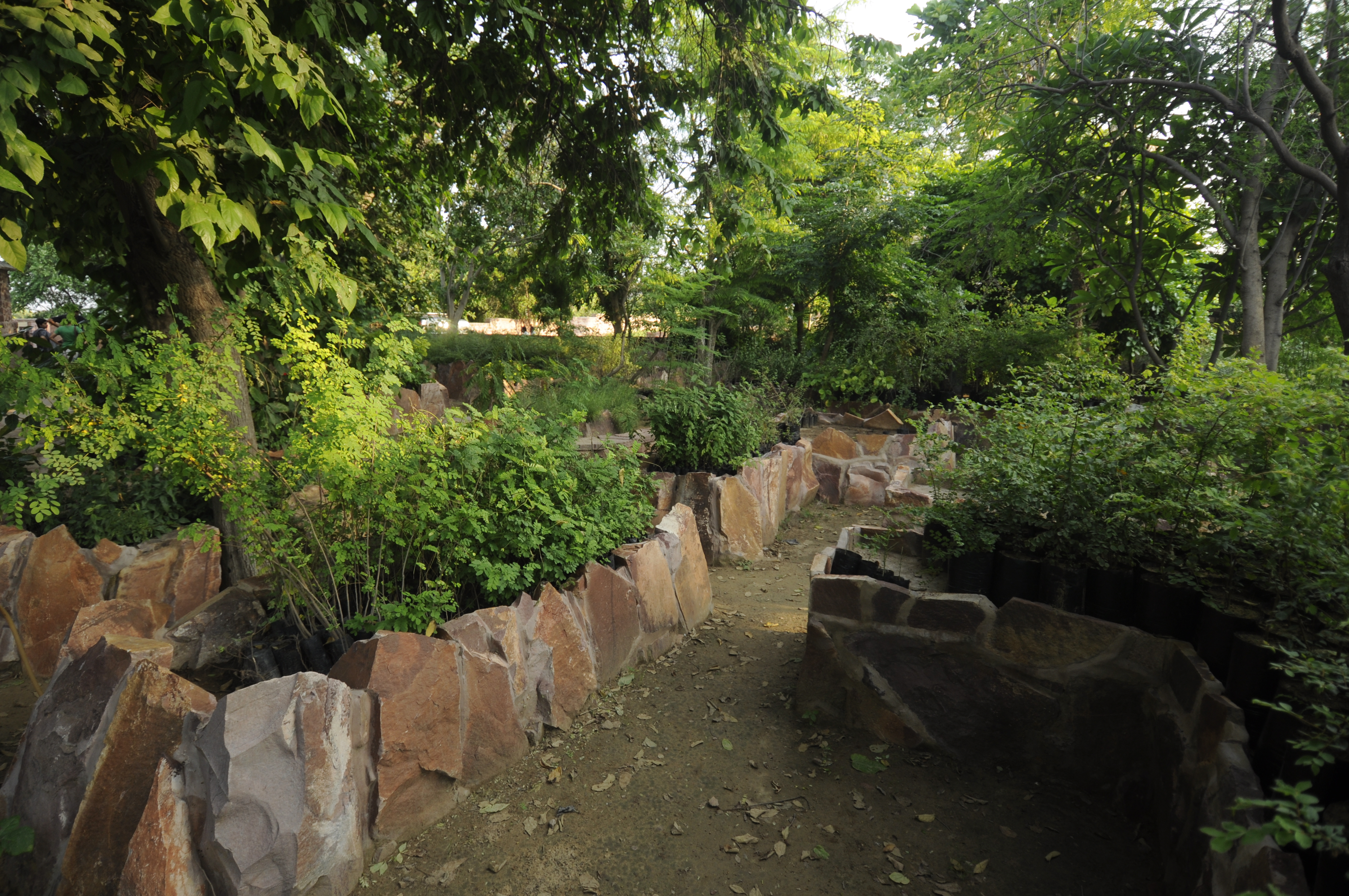
Larger native plant seedlings stacked in the nursery
