= Dariba, Rajasthan =

Town in Rajasthan, India

Dariba
- Village
- Location in Rajasthan, India Dariba (India)
- Coordinates: 24.95°N 74.13°E
- Country: India
- State: Rajasthan
- District: Rajsamand
- Elevation: 479 m (1,572 ft)

Population (2011)
  - Total: 2,096

Languages
  - Official: Hindi
- Time zone: UTC+5:30 (IST)
- Postal code: 313211

Dariba is a village in Railmagra tehsil in Rajsamand district in the state of Rajasthan in India.

== Geography ==
Dariba is located at an elevation of 479 m (1,572 ft) in Rajsamand district, Rajasthan.

== Demographics ==
As per the 2011 Census of India, Dariba had a population of 2,096 individuals of which 1,334 were males and 762 were females. About 6.9% of the population is under the age of six years. Dariba had an average literacy rate of 87.75%, higher than the state average of 66.1%. The male literacy was 90.5% and, female literacy was 83%.

== Mineral belt ==
Dariba is an important zinc and lead mining and smelting region of Rajasthan. The gossan in Dariba, formed through prolonged weathering and oxidation of sulfide minerals, was declared as a National Geological Monument by the Geological Survey of India in 1976.
