= Pillow lavas, Nomira =

Geological formation in Odisha, India

- Location within Odisha
- Coordinates: 21°54′13.5″N 85°26′17.8″E
- Location: Nomira, Kendujhar district, Odisha, India

National Geological Monuments of India
- Official name: Pillow lavas, Iron ore belt, Nomira
- Designated: 1976
- Designated by: Geological Survey of India

Pillow lavas at Nomira is a geological formation in the iron ore mining belt in Kendujhar district of the Indian state of Odisha. It was notified as a National Geological Monument by the Geological Survey of India in 1976.

== Geography ==
The geological formation is located on a 500 m (1,600 ft) high low-lying hill in Kendujhar district, Odisha. The geological site, spread over 2.5 acres (1.0 ha), was notified as a National Geological Monument by the Geological Survey of India in 1976.

== Geology ==
The generalised stratigraphy of the region comprises Craton Cover sequences, including the Kolhan Group (~200 Ma), the Singhbhum Batholith (3.1–3.3 Ga), the Keonjhar–Bhaunra Pluton (~3.29 Ga), the Iron Ore Group (~3.51 Ga), consisting of tuff, dolomite, basalt, dacite, and rhyolite, and the older Old Metamorphic Group (>3.6 Ga), including tonalite gneiss.

Pillow lavas at Nomira are a well-preserved exposure of volcanic formations on the face of the low hillock in the Iron Ore Group. It provides geological evidence of Archean submarine volcanism and represents one of the oldest greenstone sequences in India. The pillow structures are formed from Archean basaltic volcanic rocks. The pillows are nearly spherical and closely packed, measuring up to 2 m × 0.6 m (6 ft 7 in × 2 ft 0 in). The lavas and associated pyroclastic tuffs are surrounded by shale, chert-shale and banded hematite–jasper, while quartzite occurs within the sequence. Lineations and scrape marks may also occur on the sides of the pillows.

The pillow lavas formed when hot basaltic lava was extruded underwater. The sudden contact with cold water caused the outer surface of the lava to cool rapidly and form a fine-grained, glassy crust, while the interior cooled more slowly. Slow extrusion allowed thick crusts to develop around individual lava lobes, producing the characteristic pillow-shaped structures. Successive pillows accumulated to form pillow flows, often producing steep-sided mounds or ridges.

== See also ==
- Pillow lavas, Maradihalli
