= Pillow lavas, Maradihalli =

Geological formation in Karnataka, India

- Location within Karnataka
- Coordinates: 13.95°N 76.62°E
- Location: Maradihalli, Chitradurga district, Karnataka, India

National Geological Monuments of India
- Official name: Pillow lavas near Maradihalli
- Designated: 1975
- Designated by: Geological Survey of India

Pillow lavas at Maradihalli is a geological formation in Chitradurga district of the Indian state of Karnataka. It was notified as a National Geological Monument by the Geological Survey of India in 1975.

== Geography ==
The Maradihalli Hills form part of the Chitradurga greenstone belt, which represents a former submarine basin. It is located in Chitradurga district, Karnataka. The geological site, spread over 2.5 acres (1.0 ha), was notified as a National Geological Monument by the Geological Survey of India in 1975.

== Geology ==
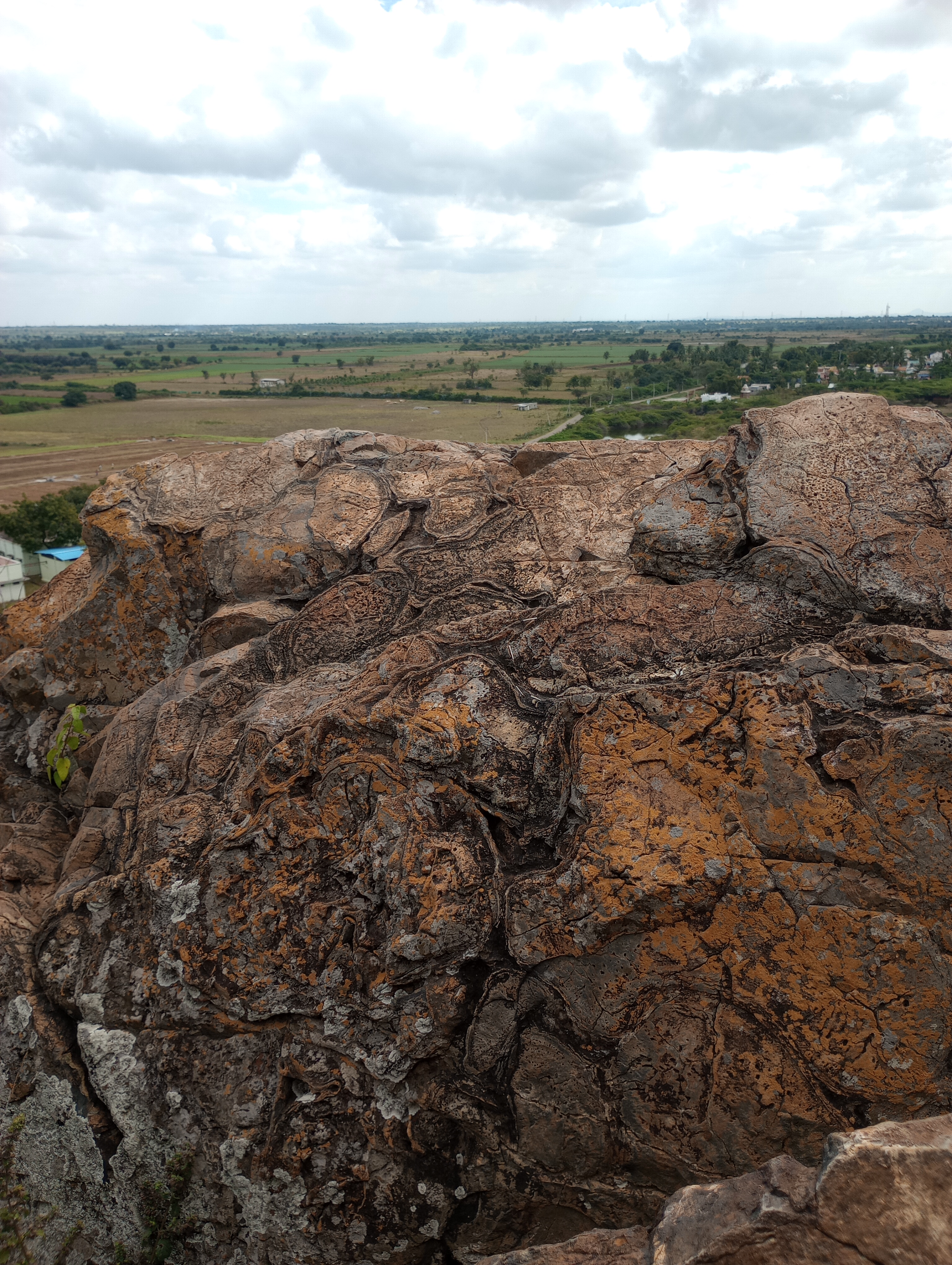
Pillow lavas near Maradihalli

The Maradihalli pillow lavas occur within the Chitradurga schist belt of the Dharwar Group. Dating to about 2.5 billion years, it provides evidence for understanding the evolution of Precambrian peninsular India. The Chitradurga schist belt is bounded on both sides by older gneissic rocks, about three billion years old. The basaltic lavas are found on a small, elongated rocky mound, with a massive core surrounded by lava pillows along its crest and sides.

Pillow lavas are volcanic rocks formed when hot molten lava erupts underwater. On coming into contact with cold water, the lava cools rapidly and breaks into rounded or roughly spherical bodies called pillows. These pillows generally have flat bottoms and rounded tops. Their shape and arrangement are useful for determining the order of rock layers in deformed geological formations. The pillow lavas measure up to 1 m (3 ft 3 in) in diameter and consist of radial fractures measuring 3–5 cm (1.2–2.0 in).

== See also ==
- Pillow lavas, Nomira
