= Venkata (hill) =

Mountain in Andhra Pradesh, India

- Venkatadri, Venkatachalam
- Location within Andhra Pradesh Location within India

Highest point
- Elevation: 853 m (2,799 ft)
- Coordinates: 13°40′59.7″N 79°20′49.9″E

Geography
- Location: Tirumala, Andhra Pradesh, India
- Parent range: Seshachalam Hills, Eastern Ghats

The Venkata hill (853 m) is part of the Seshachalam Hills, located in the Tirupati district of Andhra Pradesh, India. Also known as Venkatadri, Venkatagiri or Venkatachalam, Venkatam, it is one of the seven peaks of the Tirumala Hill located in the temple town of Tirumala. The popular Tirumala Venkateswara Temple is located on this hill. It is dedicated to the Hindu god Venkateswara, a form of Vishnu, also known as Tirupati or Balaji.

== History ==
The Venkatam hill is mentioned in Tamil Sangam literature dated to 300BCE as part of being Tamilakam boundaries. However, it does not sufficiently establishes that its same as single peak of present-day Venkatam hill and may refer more broadly to the northern hill ranges.
