= National Geological Monuments of India =

National Geological Monuments are geological areas of national importance as notified by the Geological Survey of India. These geoheritage sites are notified in an effort to improve their maintenance, protection, promotion and enhancement of geotourism. The Geological Survey of India and the respective state governments are responsible for taking necessary measures to protect these sites.

As of 2026, there are 35 notified National Geological Monuments. The National Fossil Wood Parks at Tiruvakkarai and Sathanur in Tamil Nadu were the first to be declared as National Geological Monuments in 1951. With 12 sites, Rajasthan has the most such monuments, followed by Karnataka (5) and Andhra Pradesh and Tamil Nadu (4 each).

== List of National Geological Monuments ==
List of National Geological Monuments
Year	Name	Image	Location	State	Notes
1951	National Fossil Wood Park, Tiruvakkarai		Thiruvakkarai, Viluppuram district	Tamil Nadu	Fossil remains of conifer and palm trees from the Miocene–Pliocene epochs, transported by rivers and later fossilised after the wood was replaced by silica from the sediments.
1951	National Fossil Wood Park, Sathanur		Sathanur, Perambalur district	Tamil Nadu	Petrified gymnosperms from the Late Cretaceous (100.5–66 Ma), formed on eroded granulite rocks.
1972	Akal Wood Fossil Park		Akal, Jaisalmer district	Rajasthan	Petrified wood and fossilised tree trunks from the Lower Jurassic (~180 Ma) over a 21 ha (52 acres) area, along with fossils of invertebrates such as gastropods and ammonites, which were formed when forests in warm, humid climate bordering the sea were rapidly buried in sediments and followed by replacement of the wood by silica.
1974	Shivalik Fossil Park		Suketi, Sirmaur district	Himachal Pradesh	Fossils of vertebrates dating to 1 to 1.5 Ma found in the Sivalik Hills of the Himalayas.
1975	Charnockite, St. Thomas Mount		Chennai, Chennai district	Tamil Nadu	A type of Charnockite bearing quartz–feldspar–hypersthene, formed at high temperature and pressure by the metamorphism of igneous rock.
1975	Pillow lavas, Maradihalli		Hiriyur, Chitradurga district	Karnataka	Pillow lavas occurring on a schist rock hillock, dating to the Precambrian period (2.5 Ga).
1975	Peninsular Gneiss of Lalbagh		Bengaluru, Bengaluru Urban district	Karnataka	Peninsular Gneiss rock occurring on an exposed small hillock located in the Lal Bagh gardens, dating to 2.5 to 3.4 Ga.
1975	Columnar Basalt, Coconut Islands		St. Mary's Islands, Udupi district	Karnataka	Basalt columns developed by the rapid cooling of lava flows, found on flat-topped hills in four islands off the coast of Malpe in the Deccan Traps region, dating to the Cretaceous–Eocene (about 60 Ma).
1976	Bhojunda Stromatolite Park		Bhojunda, Chittaurgarh district	Rajasthan	Stromatolites, layered sedimentary formations created by blue-green algae through the bonding of carbonate particles, occurring on limestone rocks and dating to 900 Ma, when the sea levels were higher and the region was covered by shallow water.
1976	Eparchaean Unconformity		Sapthagiri, Tirupati district	Andhra Pradesh	A significant stratigraphic discontinuity in the Earth's geological history, where gneisses formed during the Archean (4 to 2.5 Ga) meet the sedimentary rocks of the Proterozoic (2.5 to 0.54 Ma) of the Kadapa sub-group.
1976	Eddy Current Markings, Kadana		Kadana, Mahisagar district	Gujarat	Fossilised markings on sandstone and quartzite rocks formed during the orogeny of the Aravalli Range, when soft sedimentary rocks from the Proterozoic were metamorphosed.
1976	Great Boundary Fault, Satur		Satur, Bundi district	Rajasthan	Faults in the region between the Aravalli and the Vindhya Ranges that separate the younger sedimentary rocks of the Vindhyas, formed about 900 Ma, from the older pre-Aravalli rocks.
1976	Jodhpur Group – Malani Igneous Suite Contact		Jodhpur, Jodhpur district	Rajasthan	Igneous suite formed during the Precambrian period and overlain by sedimentary rocks in the Proterozoic and early Cambrian (540 Ma). The hillock on which the Mehrangarh fort stands displays a visible nonconformity between the rock layers.
1976	Pillow Lava, Iron ore belt, Nomira		Nomira, Kendujhar district	Odisha	Pillow lavas and tuffs formed from submarine volcanic activity during the Archean. These were later overlain by shale, hematite, jasper, and quartzite, and are now part of an exposed rock surface.
1976	Nepheline syenite, Kishangarh		Kishangarh, Ajmer district	Rajasthan	Intrusions of Syenite and Nepheline into metamorphic rocks of the Aravalli Range, dating to the Precambrian period (1.91 to 1.59 Ga).
1976	Plant Fossil bearing Inter-trappean beds of Rajmahal Formation		Mandro, Sahibganj district	Jharkhand	Plant fossils dating to 145 to 68 Ma, found in intertrappean beds, which are thin sedimentary rock layers sandwiched between successive basaltic lava flows.
1976	Gossan in Rajpura–Dariba Mineralised belt		Rajpura–Dariba, Rajsamand district	Rajasthan	Thick, colourful gossan formed through prolonged weathering and oxidation of sulfide minerals such as sphalerite, galena, and chalcopyrite. Remnants of ancient mining are evidenced, dating to 3040 ± 150 BP, contemporary with the Indus Valley Civilisation.
1976	Jhamarkotra Stromatolite Park		Jhamarkotra, Udaipur district	Rajasthan	The world's largest phosphorite deposits, containing algal stromatolite fossils in Proterozoic Aravalli dolomitic limestone (~1.8 Ga).
1976	Pyroclastic rocks, Peddapalli		Peddapalli, Kolar district	Karnataka	Welded agglomerate of rounded to angular fragments of granite, gneiss, basalt, and banded ferruginous quartzite set in an ignimbrite matrix, formed around 2.9 Ga during submarine volcanic activity. The pyroclastic rocks are part of the Kolar Schist Belt and represent violent, glowing avalanche-type volcanic eruptions.
1976	Welded Tuff, Jodhpur		Jodhpur, Jodhpur district	Rajasthan	Welded tuff composed of volcanic ejecta containing glass, quartz, and feldspar, which developed columnar joints and terraces upon cooling. Varied coloured Malani rhyolites are interlayered with tuff and pyroclastic rocks.
1977	Barr Conglomerate		Barr, Pali district	Rajasthan	Pebbles of quartzite and aplite, along with fine grained schists consisting of mica, set on underlying gneiss.
1977	Sendra Granite		Beawar, Pali district	Rajasthan	Old granite dating to ~1.2 Ga intruded the Beawar lithostratigraphic rock unit, dating ~1.5 Ga, which was exposed after uplift and weathered over the last 500 Ma.
1979	Lonar Lake		Lonar, Buldhana district	Maharashtra	A saline and soda lake in an impact crater formed by a hyper-velocity meteorite impact about 50 ka ago. The 1.83 km (1.14 mi) wide, 150 m (490 ft) deep impact structure is one of the youngest and best-preserved impact structures on Earth, with compact, vesicular and amygdaloidal basalt exposed around the crater.
1979	Angadipuram Laterite		Angadipuram, Malappuram district	Kerala	Laterite deposits along the Arabian Sea coast, featuring a unique combination of pyroxene granulite, charnockite, and migmatite.
1981	Natural Geological Arch		Tirumala, Tirupati district	Andhra Pradesh	A natural arch, 8 m (26 ft) wide and 3 m (9.8 ft) high, formed by weathering of quartzite rocks dating to Middle to Upper Proterozoic (1.6 to 0.53 Ga).
1982	Bedded Barytes, Mangampet		Mangampeta, Annamayya district	Andhra Pradesh	Single largest baryte (mineral of Barium sulphate) deposit in the world, through precipitation of volcanic vapours and deposition of volcanic ash under submarine conditions during the Proterozoic (2.5 to 0.53 Ga).
1983	Marine Gondwana Fossil Park		Ammakherwa, Surguja district	Chhattisgarh	A fossil park preserving marine Permian fossils (280–240 Ma) of invertebrate such as Eurydesma, Aviculopecten, bryozoans, crinoids, and foraminifers, within the carbonaceous shale of the Talcher Formation of the Gondwana Supergroup. The diverse , records a Permian marine transgression into central India.
2001	Naga Hills Ophiolite		Pungro, Kiphire district	Nagaland	The Naga Hill Ophiolite is an example of oceanic lithosphere obducted onto continental crust, consisting of Mesozoic–Cenozoic magmatic and sedimentary rocks, along the Indo–Burma convergence zone.
2014	Stromatolite bearing Dolomite / Limestone of Buxa Formation at Mamley		Namchi, South Sikkim district	Sikkim	The site exposes dolostones of the Proterozoic Buxa Formation of the Daling Group, which are stromatolitic structures formed by algae during the Precambrian, and preserve rare evidence of early life in the Eastern Himalayas.
2015	Badlands of Karai Formation		Karai, Perambalur district	Tamil Nadu	Fossils from the Late Cretaceous found along Karai – Kulakkalnattam section, deposited in the Karai Formation, a Mesozoic (252 to 66 Ma) geological formation composed of gypsiferous mudstone, silty sandy clay, and sandstone deposited in a dry basin.
2015	Varkala Cliff Section		Varkala, Thiruvananthapuram district	Kerala	Warkalli cliff formations along a 7.5 km (4.7 mi) stretch of the Arabian Sea coast, formed by erosion during the Miocene–Pliocene (23 to 2.58 Ma).
2016	Erra Matti Dibbalu		Vishakhapatnam–Bheemunipatnam, Visakhapatnam district	Andhra Pradesh	Dissected and stabilized red sand mounds along the Bay of Bengal coast between Vishakhapatnam and Bheemunipatnam, formed by erosion of deposited sediments.
2018	Ramgarh crater		Ramgarh, Baran district	Rajasthan	An eroded impact crater in the Mesoproterozoic Vindhyan Supergroup (1.6–1.0 Ga) that consists of iron-rich impact spherules and coesite, which indicates that the crater was formed by the impact of a copper-rich iron meteorite.
2018	Zawar Lead–Zinc mine		Zawar, Udaipur district	Rajasthan	The lead–zinc mine is part of the Paleoproterozoic Aravalli Supergroup, where sulphide minerals occurs within a carbonate-bearing sequence of metamorphosed sediments in an extensional rift basin and is known for its ancient zinc-mining and smelting.
2026	Yana Caves		Yana, Uttara Kannada	Karnataka	Caves formed in Precambrian dolomitic limestone dating to ~2.7 Ga and exposed by epeirogenic movement. Prolonged tropical weathering and chemical dissolution from percolating rainwater resulted in distinctive karst landforms, with fissures, caverns, and sinkholes.

== Geo-tourism sites in Northeast India ==
In 2021, the Geological Survey of India listed 12 sites in Northeast India for the promotion of geo-tourism. These included two declared National Geoheritage Sites of Mamley Stromatolite Park and Nagahill Ophiolite Site.

List of Geotourism Sites in Northeast India
Site	Image	Location	State	Notes
Mawmluh Cave		East Khasi Hills district	Meghalaya	The cave provided the stalagmite evidence defining the Meghalayan Age, the youngest age of the Quaternary, marked by a major abrupt climatic event with drought and cooling dating 4.2 ka.
Mawblei God's Rock		East Khasi Hills district	Meghalaya	A large balancing rock, made of reddish-purple Mahadek sandstone of the Cretaceous-age Khasi Group, slanting at about 45 degrees towards the south-southeast, on a hill slope overlooking the Wahrashi River valley.
Therriaghat		East Khasi Hills district	Meghalaya	One of the best-preserved and most complete Cretaceous-Paleogene boundary (K–Pg) in India, recording the major mass extinction event at the end of the Cretaceous, which caused caused the sudden extinction of several species.
Majuli		Majuli district	Assam	The world's largest river island is a fluvial landform in the Brahmaputra basin, formed as a vast alluvial plain from the deposition of sediments carried by the river and its tributaries.
Umananda Island		Kamrup Metropolitan district	Assam	An inselberg in the Brahmaputra river, composed of the rocks of the Assam-Meghalaya gneissic complex.
Chabimura		Gomati district	Tripura	Rock-carved panels on a steep hill wall along the bank of the Gomati River, featuring monumental images of Hindu deities dating to the 15th–16th centuries.
Unakoti		Unakoti district	Tripura	A historic Hindu pilgrimage site with numerous rock-cut sculptures and temples dating to the 7th–9th centuries.
Sangetsar Tso		Tawang district	Arunachal Pradesh	Also called as Madhuri Lake, it is a landslide-dammed lake near the India–Tibet border formed when a major earthquake in 1950 blocked a river valley.
Loktak Lake		Bishnupur district	Manipur	The largest freshwater lake in Northeast India, it is characterised by floating biomass known as phumdis and fishermen's huts called phumsangs. The southwestern part of the lake contains the Keibul Lamjao National Park, the world's only floating national park and the last natural habitat of the endangered sangai.
Reiek Tlang		Aizawl district	Mizoram	A cuesta formed by the erosion of Tertiary sandstone–shale alterations, characterised by a gentle slope on one side and a steep slope on the other.

== See also ==
- List of Water Heritage Sites in India
- List of World Heritage Sites in India
- Monuments of National Importance of India
- State Protected Monuments of India
