= Frederick Richard Mallet =

Irish geologist (1841–1921)

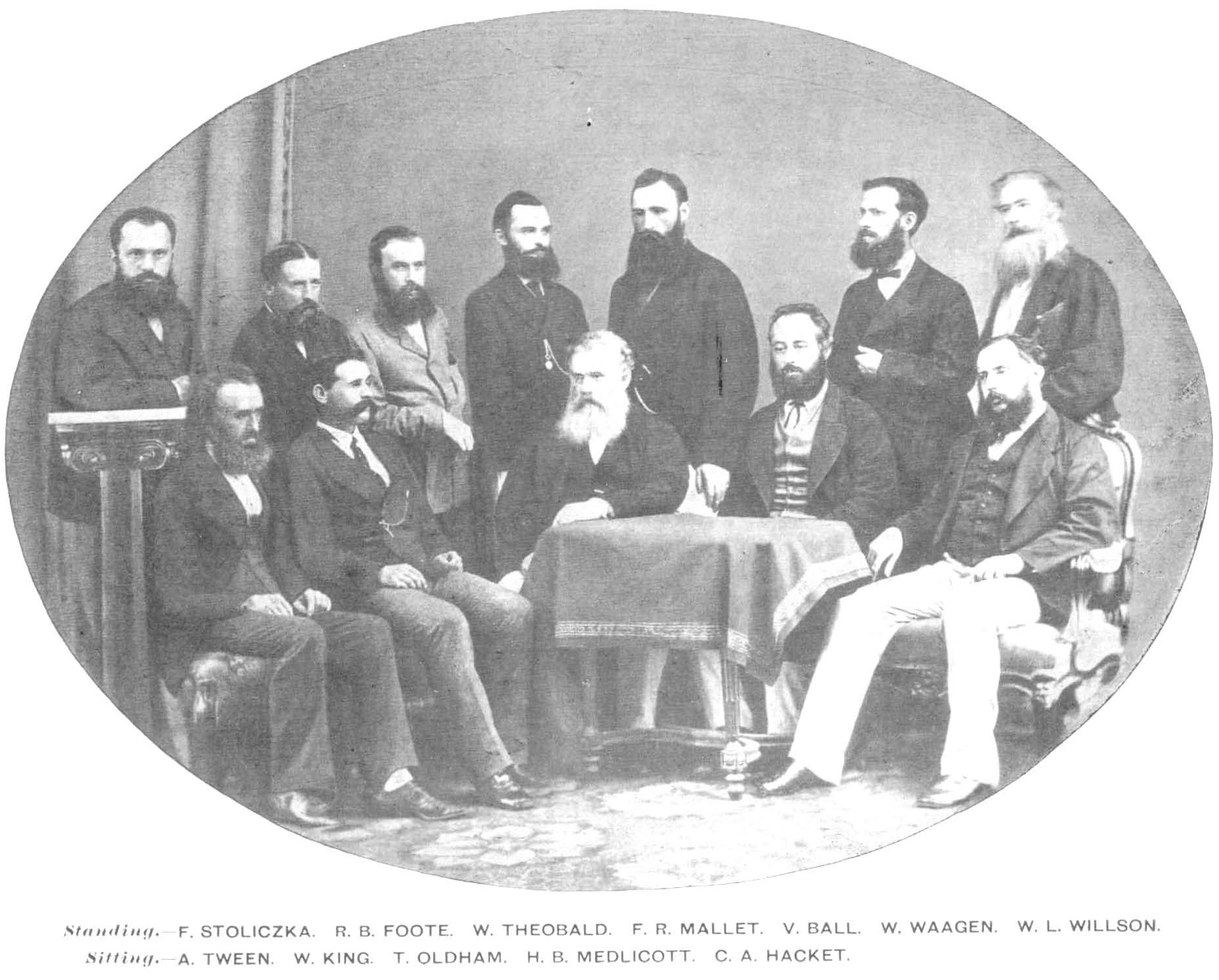
The GSI in 1870. Standing: Ferdinand Stoliczka, Robert Bruce Foote, William Theobald, F. R. Mallet, Valentine Ball, Wilhelm Heinrich Waagen, W. L. Wilson; Sitting: A. Tween, W. King, Thomas Oldham, Henry Benedict Medlicott, C. A. Hackett

Frederick Richard Mallet (10 February 1841 – 24 June 1921) was an Irish geologist who worked for thirty years with the Geological Survey of India.

== Life and work ==
Mallet was born in Dublin, the son of Robert Mallet, a geologist. After studying at the Enniskillen Royal School in 1858 he joined the Geological Survey of India in February 1859. He worked in the Himalayas, Central India, Assam and Burma while also being in charge of the Museum and Laboratory. He published numerous papers concerning the geology of the Vindhya Range and examined the Barren Island volcano in the Andaman Islands. He became a Superintendent of the Survey in 1883 and retired in 1889. He contributed to Medlicott's Manual of the Geology of India, the fourth part which dealt with mineralogy. Mallet was involved with the survey of coalfields in the Naga Hills, the Son Valley, southern Mirzapur, and Rewa. He accompanied Ferdinand Stoliczka and William Theobald on expeditions to the Sutlej and Spiti valleys. He was the first geologist to study scientifically the Ramgarh crater, in 1869.

Apart from geology, he was also interested in biology, corresponding with Allan Octavian Hume on birds.

He was elected to Geological Society of London in 1868. He died at Ealing from ailments of the kidneys and prostate.
