= Medlicott =

Medlicott is a surname. It may refer to:

- Frank Medlicott (1903–1972), British politician
- Henry Benedict Medlicott (1829–1905), Irish geologist; younger brother of Joseph
- Joseph G. Medlicott (died 1866), Irish geologist; older brother of Henry
- Judith Medlicott, New Zealand lawyer and former Chancellor of the University of Otago
- Walter Medlicott (1879−1970), English cricketer
- William Norton Medlicott (1900–1987), British historian
- Medlicott (Cambridgeshire cricketer) (first name and dates unknown; c.1795–?), English first-class cricketer

== Other uses ==
- Medlicott, Shropshire; see List of United Kingdom locations: Me-Mic
- Medlicott Dome, a prominent granite dome in Yosemite high country, named after Henry P. Medlicott, surveyor of the Tioga Road

== See also ==
- Sawyer–Medlicott House, a historic house at the junction of Bradford and River roads in Piermont, New Hampshire
