= M. S. Krishnan (geologist) =

Indian geologist (1898-1970)

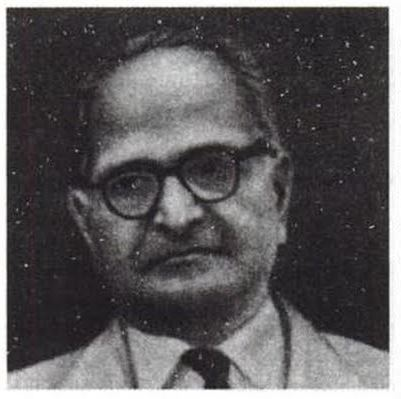
- Portrait of M. S. Krishnan
- Born: Maharajapuram Seetharaman Krishnan; 24 August 1898; Tanjore, Madras presidency, British India
- Died: 24 April 1970 (aged 71)
- Occupation: Geologist

Maharajapuram Seetharaman Krishnan (24 August 1898 – 24 April 1970) was an Indian Geologist. He was the first Indian to serve as the Director of the Geological Survey of India.

== Early years ==
Krishnan was born on 24 August 1898 in Tanjore, Madras Presidency. After school education in Tanjore, he continued his studies in St.Joseph's College, Tiruchirappalli. He graduated with B.A. Honours in geology from the Presidency College, Madras, in 1919, undertook post-graduate training and research with ARCS (Associate-ship of Royal College of Science) Scholarship at Imperial College London in 1921 and received his Diploma of Imperial College (DIC) in 1923 and in 1924, he was awarded the PhD degree from London University.

== Career ==
For two years after receiving his honours degree, Dr. Krishnan was employed as Demonstrator in Geology at Presidency College, Madras. He was appointed as Assistant Superintendent (Geologist) in the superior service in the Geological Survey of India and joined the department in December 1924 where Dr. Krishnan worked alongside Lewis Fermor, C. S. Fox, J. A. Dunn, Alexander M. Heron, H. C. Jones, and J. B. Auden. In 1943, he was promoted as superintending geologist and was posted as director for newly formed Indian Bureau of Mines. He left the post in February, 1951 to become permanent director (The first Indian to occupy it) of Geological Survey of India. After four years he was transferred to New Delhi as Mineral Adviser and Ex-Officio Joint Secretary to the Government of India (Ministry of Scientific Research) in August, 1955. In April, 1957 he was transferred to Indian School of Mines as its first director to organize the expanded courses in mining and newly started course in Applied Geophysics and Petroleum Technology.

He worked on stratigraphic mapping in Gangpur, Bonai, Bamra and Keonjar (parts of present Orissa State) and identified the 'Gangpur Series' published in GSI Memoir 71 (1937). He also worked on minerals of economic importance including iron, manganese ores, gypsum, mica, limestone and published his studies in the GSI Memoir 80 (1952). He also worked on the rocks of Girnar and the Osham hills of Saurashtra (now in Gujarat), lateritization of the peculiar metasedimentary rocks called khondalite, the mineral resources of former Central Provinces and Berar (now forming parts of Madhya Pradesh), the geology of the Vindhyan formations of northern India, the Deccan traps, the Tertiaries of Tanjore (Tamil Nadu), and made observations on mythical rivers such as the Indobrahm and Saraswathi.

He taught geology at the Presidency College, Madras (1920–21), Forest College, Dehra Dun (1928–30) and the Presidency College, Calcutta (1933–35). At the suggestion of Cyril S. Fox of the Geological Survey of India (GSI) he decided to work on a book on Indian stratigraphy. This resulted in the publication of Geology of India and Burma in 1943 and the Introduction to Geology of India in 1944. The first book has gone through 6 editions and has also been translated into Russian. Krishnan served as the Director of Indian Bureau of Mines (New Delhi) from 1948 to 1951, Director of the GSI, Director of Indian School of Mines, Dhanbad, during 1957–58, Head of the Geology and Geophysics Department, Andhra University, Waltair from 1958 to 1960, and helped found the National Geophysical Research Institute, Hyderabad, of which he was the director between 1961 and 1963.

He received the Padma Bhushan in January 1970 from President S. Radhakrishnan. In 2025, a 3.5 billion-year-old crater in Mars has been named after him.
