= William Dixon West =

English geologist (1901–1994)

William Dixon West CIE, MBE, FNA
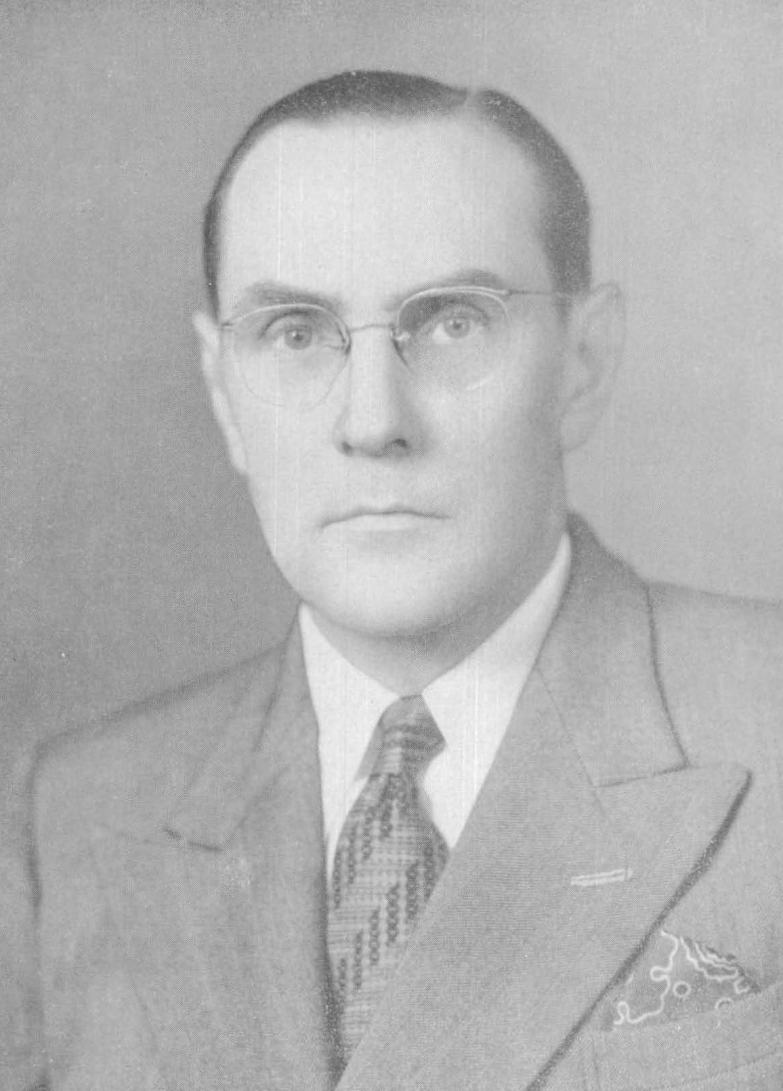
- Born: January 27, 1901; Bournemouth, England, United Kingdom
- Died: May 23, 1994 (aged 93); Bhopal, Madhya Pradesh, India
- Education: St John's College, Cambridge
- Awards: Lyell Medal
- Scientific career
- Fields: Geology

William Dixon West CIE, MBE, FNA (27 January 1901 – 23 May 1994) was an English geologist who worked in India with the Geological Survey of India and was involved in establishing a department of applied geology at the Sagar University in Sagar Madhya Pradesh.

== Early life ==
West was born in Bournemouth, the son of A.J. West who worked on railways in North Borneo. After growing up in Jesselton, North Borneo, he went to King's School, Canterbury where he excelled in football. He also became interested in geology and studied the subject at St John's College, Cambridge where a major influence was the petrologist Alfred Harker.

== Career ==
West received a Winchester Prize in 1922 and joined the Geological Survey of India in 1923. He worked with Lewis L. Fermor in central India and then studied the Deolapar Nappe (in Sausar) which he discovered in 1936 and the Shali Window near Shimla. He worked along with G.E. Pilgrim and explored stratigraphy in the Himalayas which led to a DSc from Cambridge University in 1945. He took an interest in the 1935 Quetta earthquake and suggested that it was due to strain in the looped fold axis in the region. He was involved in surveys for coal and discovered the reserves in Dara-e-Suf in the Afghan Hindu-Kush. West became director of the Geological Survey of India in 1945 and held the position until Indian Independence when he returned to England.

West returned to India in 1951 after an invitation from R.P. Tripathi, vice chancellor at Saugar University. He joined the university and organized a department of applied geology there, working in collaboration with manganese mining industry in the area. He retired from the university in 1977 but remained Professor Emeritus. He died in Bhopal following a sudden illness, having maintained good health in his later years.

In 1935, West was appointed a Foundation Fellow of the National Institute of Sciences of India (FNI, now the Indian National Science Academy). (Note: Prior to 1970, the Indian National Science Academy was named the "National Institute of Sciences of India", and its fellows bore the post-nominal "FNI". The post-nominal became "FNA" in 1970 when the association adopted its present name.) He was awarded the Lyell Medal by the Geological Society of London in 1951, and further received the P. N. Bose Medal of the Asiatic Society of Bengal in 1959, along with the D. N. Wadia Gold Medal of the Indian National Science Academy in 1983. The royal Afghan government decorated him with the Order of the Star of Afghanistan in 1942. Following his initial retirement as Director of the Geological Survey of India, the British government appointed him a Companion of the Order of the Indian Empire (CIE) in the 1948 New Year Honours list, retroactive to 14 August 1947. He was further appointed a Member of the Order of the British Empire, Civil Division (MBE) in the 1990 Birthday Honours list, for services as professor at Saugar University.

== Controversy ==
West noted the importance of the Narmada-Son Lineament and that no Gondwana rocks lay to its north or Vindhyan rocks to its south but did not cite the earlier work of Joseph G. Medlicott for which West has been accused of plagiarism.
