= Carl Ludolf Griesbach =

Austrian paleontologist and geologist

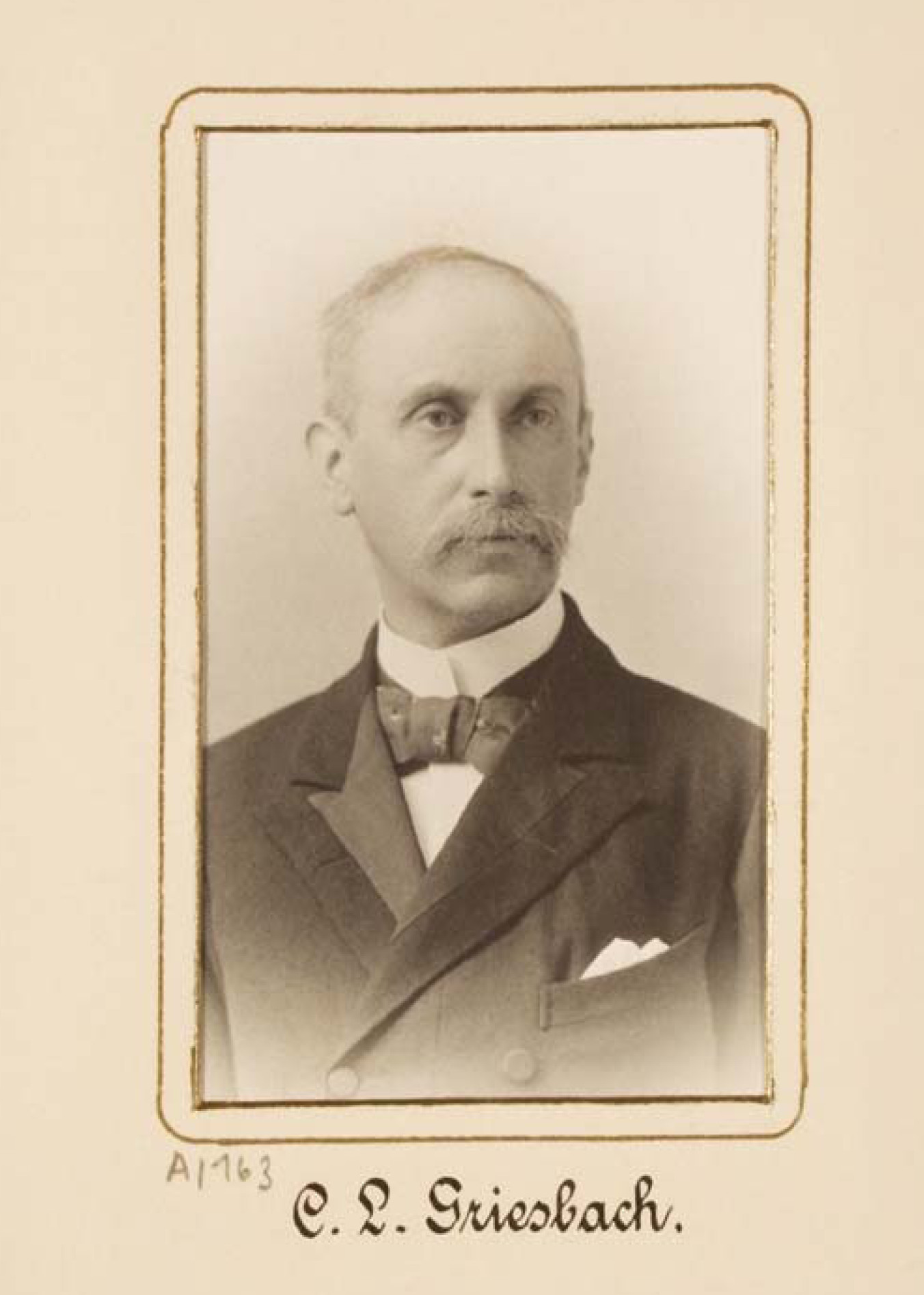
- Carl Griesbach (prior to 1903)
- Born: 11 December 1847; Vienna
- Died: 13 April 1907 (aged 59); Graz
- Occupations: Paleontologist, geologist

Carl Ludolf Griesbach (11 December 1847 – 13 April 1907), was an Austrian paleontologist and geologist who worked in East Africa and India.

== Life ==
Carl Ludolf Griesbach was born in Vienna to George Ludolph Griesbach. He studied at the University of Vienna and worked with the Geological Survey of Vienna. He joined a German expedition to East Africa in 1869-70 and returned to live in London. He wrote on the geology of Natal, with numerous illustrations made by himself. In 1878 he joined the Geological Survey of India in Calcutta. He was part of the Afghan Boundary Commission between 1884 and 1886. For his work during this period, he was created C.I.E. in February 1887 and awarded the Afghan medal and clasp. He succeeded William King as Director of the Geological Survey of India in 1894.

Griesbach discovered fossils of the ammonoid Otoceras which he suggested as marking the earliest Triassic period thus marking the boundary of the Permian and the Triassic. The term Griesbachian is sometimes applied to strata belonging to this early period. In 1896, Johann Mojsisovics named the Griesbachites genus after Griesbach's work in this area. Griesbach described what he called the Haimanta System, a series of rocks made of quartz, slate and conglomerate in a layer over the Vaikrita system in the central Himalayas of Kumaon.

Griesbach was elected Fellow of the Geological Society of London in 1874. He married his cousin Emma, daughter of the Reverend W.R. Griesbach, in 1869. They had a daughter and a son and following Emma's death in 1892, Griesbach lived in Graz, Austria, with his daughter until his death.

In recognition of his work, Tim Tozer of the Geological Survey of Canada named a creek on northwest Axel Heiberg Island (Canadian High Arctic) after him, and subsequently defined the Early Triassic sub-stage of Griesbachian time at that site.

== See also ==
- Griesbachites
