= Joseph G. Medlicott =

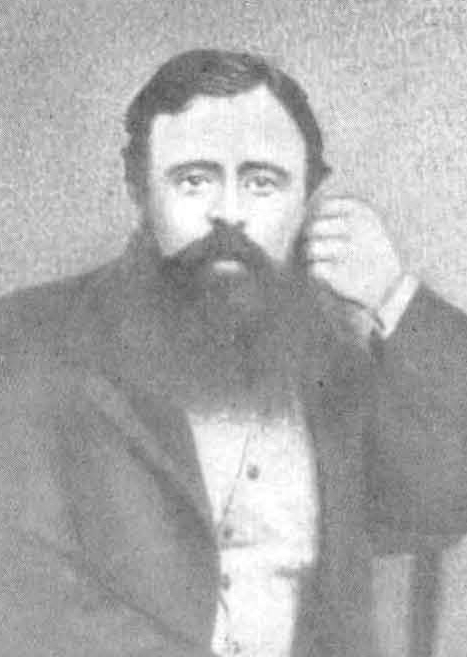

Joseph George Medlicott (? – 10 May 1866) was an Irish geologist who worked as an assistant in the Geological Survey of Ireland from 1846 to 1851 followed by work at the Geological Survey of India, where his younger brother Henry Benedict Medlicott also worked.

== Life and work ==
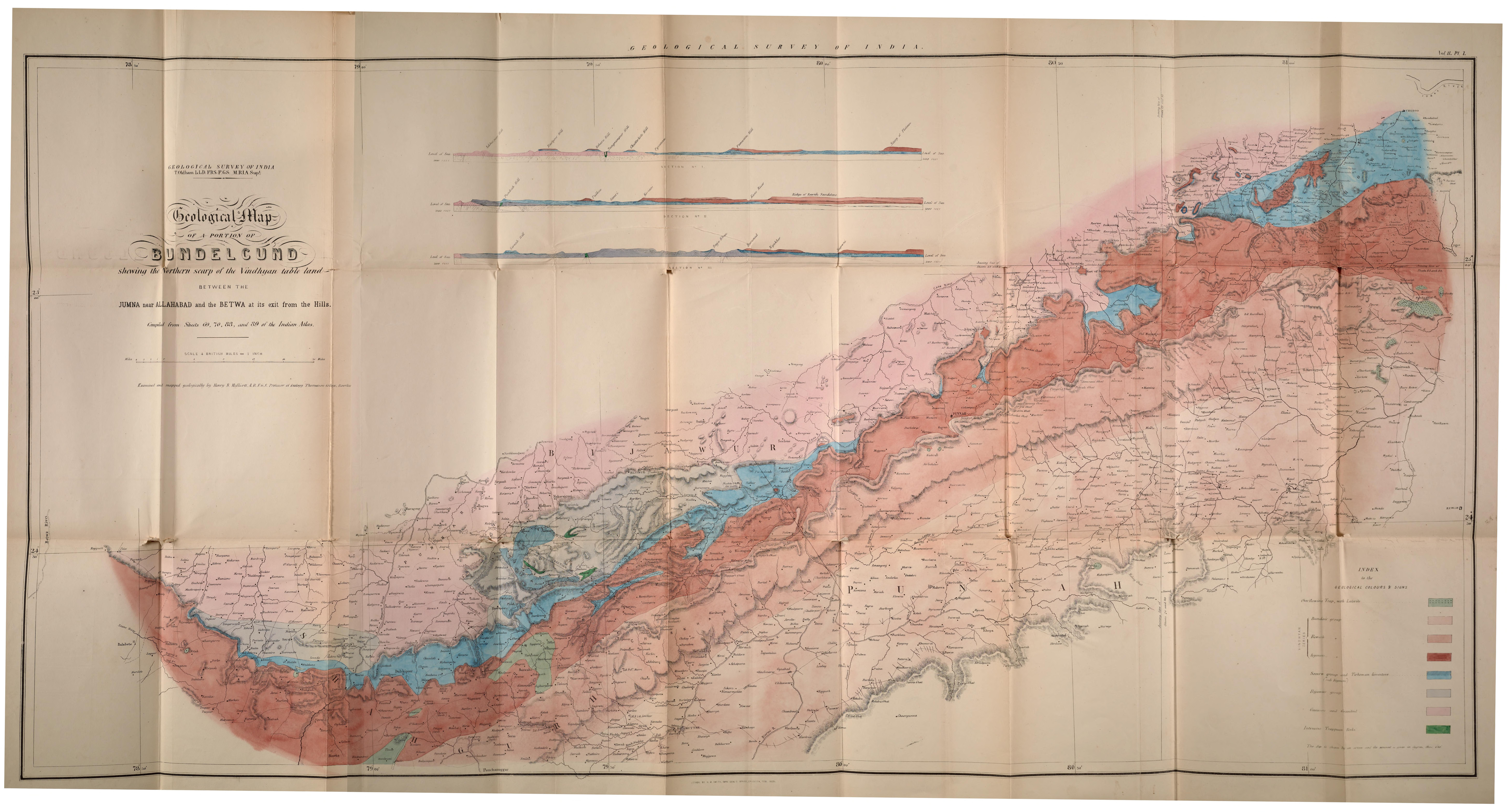
One of the maps (plate II) of central India with sections along central India (1860)

Joseph was the oldest son of Samuel Medlicott, rector of Loughrea, and his wife Charlotte, daughter of Colonel H.B. Dolphin. He graduated from Trinity College, Dublin and worked in the Geological Survey of Ireland from around 1846. In the year 1851, he relinquished his post and joined the Geological Survey of India which was established by the East India Company and the Government of Bengal. While in the Survey, he got engaged in a mapping program to find coal deposits started by Thomas Oldham, who was the first Superintendent of the Geological Survey of India. Soon after, Joseph's younger brother, Henry Benedict Medlicott also left for India and after serving as Professor of Geology at Roorkee, joined the Geological Survey of India. His brother Henry coined the term Gondwana in 1872 for the coal bearing formations of India. Together, the brothers mapped the line separating the Vindhyan and Gondwana rocks along the valleys of the Narmada and Son Rivers. He published a memoir - The Geological Structure of the Central Portion of the Nerbudda District in 1860. It is suggested that Medlicott left the Survey around 1861-62 (possibly because siblings in the same department were discouraged) and worked in Bengal. He compiled a report on cotton cultivation and served on the senate of Calcutta University. He was a frequent writer in the Calcutta Review where he reviewed Darwin's book and received a complimentary letter from the author. In 1862 he was an inspector of schools in the education department of Bengal and returned to Dublin in 1863 following paralysis. He was married to Agnes and they had a son Samuel (born 1860) who moved to British Columbia where he died in 1900.

It has been suggested that Medlicott's work was plagiarized years later by William Dixon West to whom some credit the discovery of the Narmada Sons Lineament.
