= Voysey =

Voysey is a family name, thought to derive from Vassy in Normandy, the family’s place of residence prior to the Norman Conquest.

It is the family name of the following people:

- Charles Voysey (theist), priest and heretic
  - Charles Voysey (architect), son of the above, Arts and Crafts architect and designer
    - Charles Cowles-Voysey, son of the above, architect and designer
- Henry Wesley Voysey (1791-1824), geologist who worked in India
- Michael Voysey, television writer

Spelling variants include:
Vessey	Vesey	Vezay	Vezey	Vesci	Veasey
Vassey	Vassy	Feasey	Feasy	Fessey	Fassey
Phaisey	Phasey	Phazey	Pheasey	Pheazey	Pheysey.

== See also ==
- The Voysey Inheritance, 1905 play by Harley Granville-Barker
