= Geological Survey of India =

Indian governmental organization

- Bhāratīya Bhūvaijnyānik Sarvekṣhaṇ

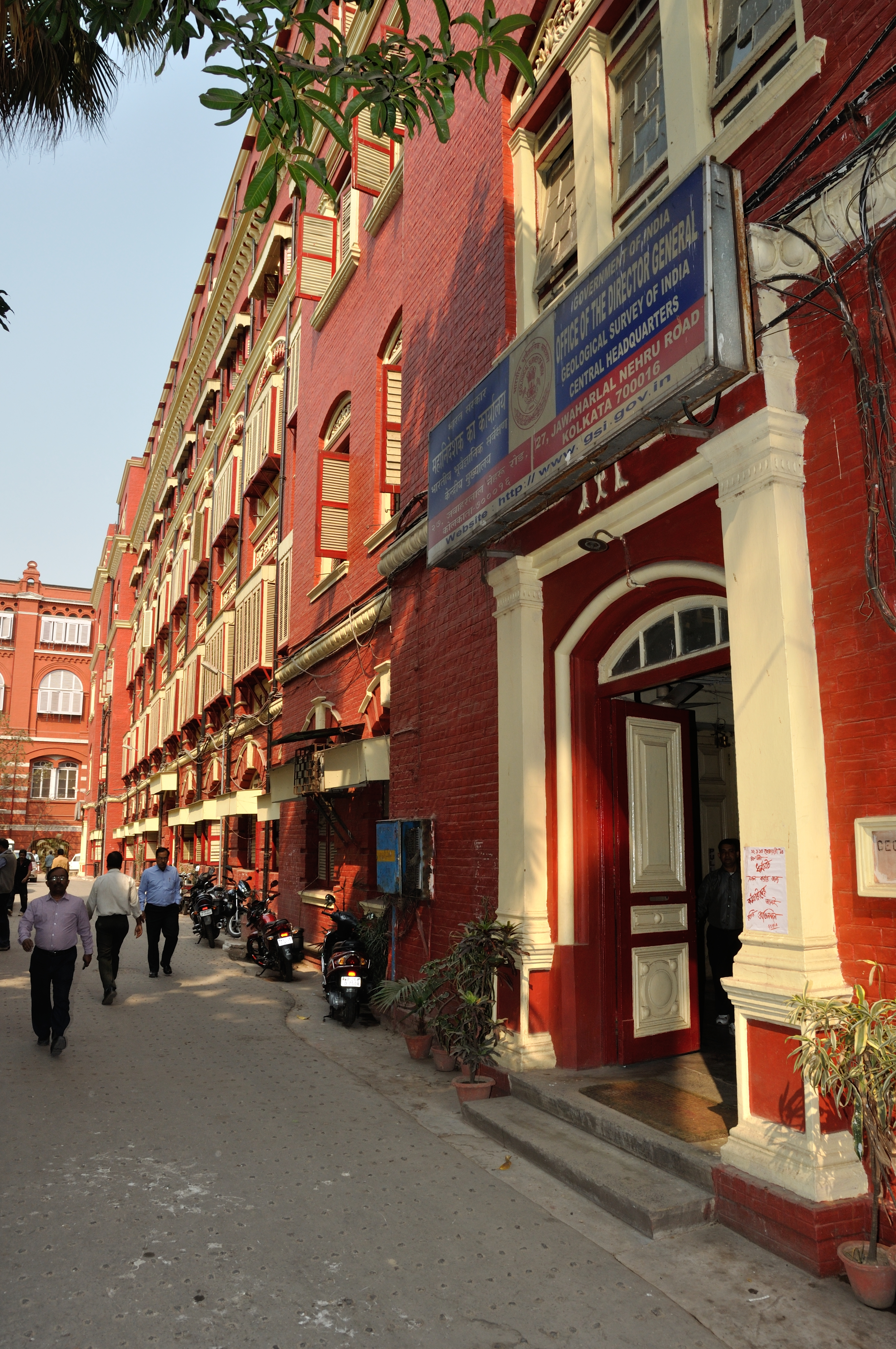
- Headquarters at Kolkata

Agency overview
- Formed: 4 March 1851; 175 years ago
- Type: Geological survey
- Jurisdiction: Government of India
- Headquarters: Kolkata
- Annual budget: ₹8 billion (US$85 million) (2019–20)
- Parent agency: Ministry of Mines
- Website: gsi.gov.in/

The Geological Survey of India (GSI) is a scientific agency under the purview of the Ministry of Mines of the Government of India. Established in 1851, it was the second survey agency to be established in British India after the Survey of India (founded in 1767). It conducts geological survey to collect data and is the primary provider of geological information to various government departments, agencies, and public.

== History ==
=== Beginnings and establishment (1818-1857) ===
In the early 19th century, members of the Survey of India carried out a few geological surveys. Henry Wesley Voysey of the Great Trigonometrical Survey of India prepared a geological map of the Hyderabad State in 1822. In 1836-37, a committee for 'The Investigation of Coal and Mineral Resources' was formed to study and explore the availability of coal in the eastern parts of India. In 1845, John McClelland, who served as the secretary of the committee, suggested the appointment of trained geologists to the committee. David Hiram Williams of the British Geological Survey, was appointed as the first official surveyor of coal districts and superintendent of coal works in Bengal on 3 December 1845 and arrived in India in February 1846. The name 'Geological Survey of India' was used for the first time on the 1847-48 report of the committee. On 4 February 1848, Williams was appointed as the geological surveyor of the Geological Survey of India. However, following his death on 15 November 1848, John McClelland took over as the officiating surveyor and remained in chrge till 1 April 1850.

The Geological Survey of India was officially established on 4 March 1851, and Thomas Oldham, who was the professor of geology at Trinity College, took charge as the official surveyor on 5 March. Seven more officers was appointed to the agency later that year. During the initial years, the agency primarily remained focused on exploration for coal. Later, based on a request by Oldham to the Governor General of India, the survey commenced to map geological structures and rock types across the country. In 1856, the headquarters of the agency was established at Hastings, Calcutta and the Museum of Economic geology, which was set up within the Asiatic Society in 1841, came under the purview of the agency. During the time, the age of rock strata was estimated from the presence of index fossils, which was time consuming to find, as the method of radiometric dating for estimating the age of rock strata was not developed at that time.

=== Extensive geological studies (1858-1896) ===
After the enactment of the Government of India Act 1858, the administration of British India was taken over directly by the British Crown from the British East India Company and the Geological Survey of India became a department of the British Empire. The agency extensively mapped India between 1857 and 1862 beginning with the Bengal region. William Thomas Blanford published the first official map of the Raniganj Coalfield and Frederick Richard Mallet worked on mapping the presence of coal and copper in the Darjeeling region. Blanford later mapped the geology of Bihar and Odisha regions, Sylhet, and Khasi Hills of the Bengal Presidency, Central Provinces, and Nilgiris in the Madras Presidency. In 1859, Thomas Henry Holland took up the geological investigation for the establishment of railways in the Raniganj region. The Bengal Iron Company was established based on the report of Henry Benedict Medlicott on the presence of iron ore in the region. In 1868, the agency had a strength of 16 surveyors. In 1869, Mallet mapped the Ramgarh crater.

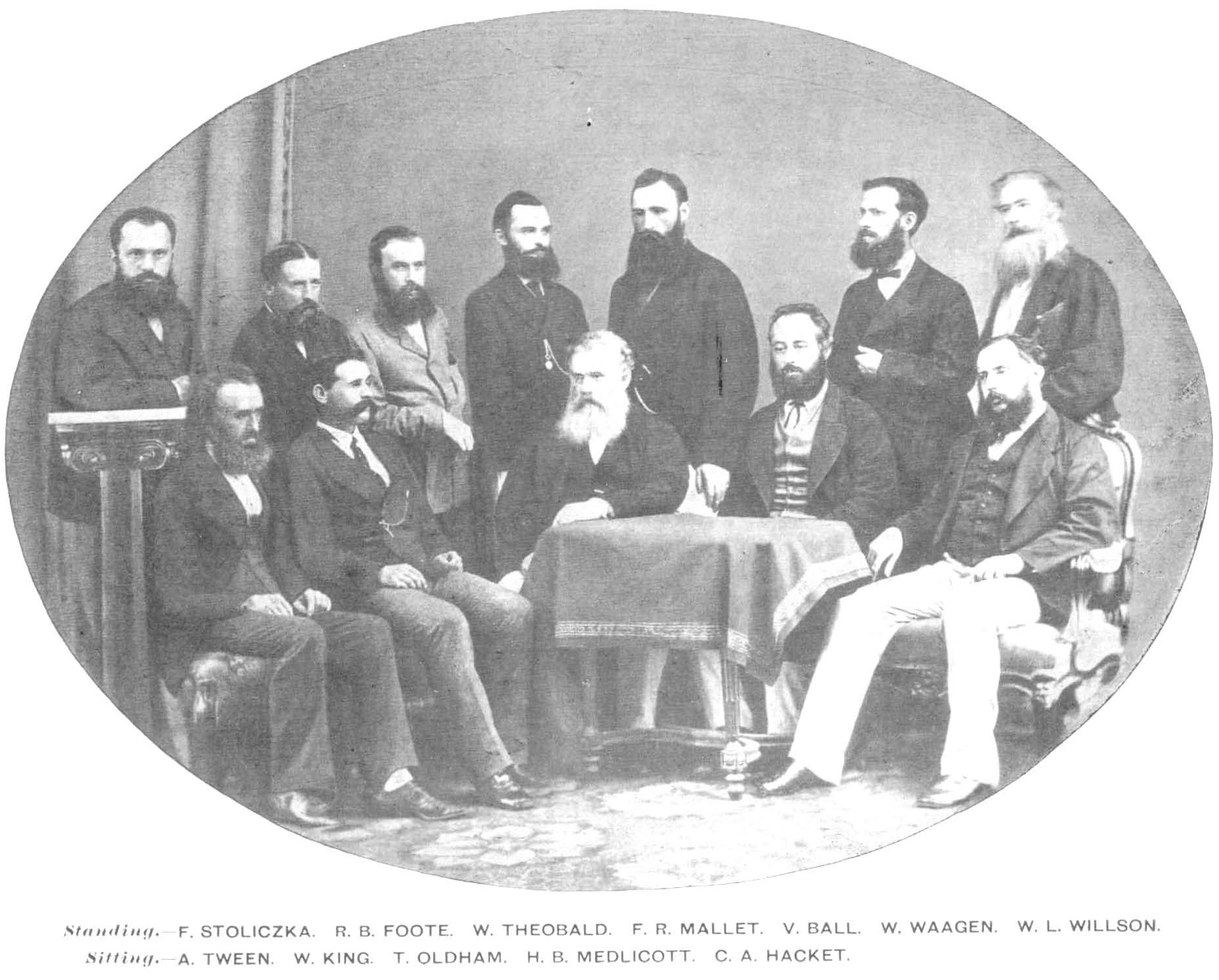
Members of the Geological Survey of India in 1870. From left to right, Standing: F. Stoliczka, R. B. Foote, W. Theobald, F. R. Mallet, V. Ball, W. H. Waagen, W. L. Willson; Sitting: A. Tween, W. King, T. Oldham, H. B. Medlicott, and C. A. Hackett.

Between 1867 and 1872, the Geological Survey of India started conducting surveys outside of India in Burma, Abyssinia, Persia, and Aden. The agency also carried out 1869 Kailash–Mansarovar expedition, 1871-72 Shigache–Lhasa expedition, 1873-74 Yarkand–Kashgar expedition, and 1878-82 Darjeeling–Lhasa–Mongolia expeditions. During these expeditions, the British personnel were assisted by native Indian surveyors, called pundits, with early ones including Nain Singh Rawat, and Krishna Singh Rawat. Medlicott carried out the mapping of Cuddapah region, and Mallet mapped the Vindhyas. The headquarters of the agency was moved to its present location on 1 January 1874 and the associated museum was opened in 1877. The first Geological Map of India was published in 1877. Initially the agency did not have a publication of its own and the studies were published in other journals such as the Journal of Asiatic Society of Bengal and Madras Journal of Literature and Science. The first record of the Geological Survey of India was published in 1876.

The Geological Survey of India started studying earthquakes in the late 1860s, and publishes a report on the 1869 Cachar earthquake. In 1880, Pramatha Nath Bose became the first Indian to join the agency as a survey officer grade in 1880 and initiated the study of rocks using the petrological microscope in the 1890s. In 1885, the position of director was established, and Medlicott, who was the head of the agency, was the first to take over the position. In 1892, the agency started teaching activities, with Holland taking classes at the Presidency College in Calcutta. The survey identified and described various new rock types such as charnockite, hypersthene-bearing granite from St. Thomas Mount in Madras, khondalite from the Eastern Ghats.

=== Further exploration (1897-1946) ===
In the late 1990s, the Geological Survey of India undertook further studies on seismology. Richard Dixon Oldham, who worked with the agency, was the first to clearly identify p- and s-waves on a seismogram, and hypothesised and calculated the diameter of the Earth's core. In 1905, the strength of the agency was raised to 25 geologists. In the early 20th century, the agency was focused on geological research towards mining and mineral exploration, and a separate mining wing was established in 1902, which later led to the formation of the Department of Mines in 1904. In 1906, Holland established the Mining, Geological & Metallurgical Institute at Calcutta. It found diamond deposits in the Singhbhum region in 1906. Discovery of iron ore by Bose at Gorumahisani led to the establishment of India's first steel plant at Jamshedpur in 1911. Studies by Lewis Leigh Fermor led to the discovery of large scale manganese deposits led to India becoming a leading manganese producer globally.

In 1907, the Geological Survey of India was involved in surveys in the Himalayas in collaboration with the Survey of India. The observations were later used for planning the 1921 British Mount Everest reconnaissance expedition. Darashaw Nosherwan Wadia, who joined the agency in 1921, created the geological maps of various Himalayan regions including the Nanga Parbat, Vale of Kashmir, and Gilgit. The agency discovered further deposits of iron ore in the Burnpur region in 1926. Cyril Fox discovered extensive coal deposits in the 1920s and 1930s including lignite in Neyveli, and bauxite and laterite deposits, which led to the formation of the Indian Aluminium Company in 1938. In the late 1930s, the agency had a majority of Indian surveyors, with 17 of the 25 surveyors being Indians in 1939. The Rare Mineral Survey Unit was founded in the early 1940s during the Second World War, and later became part of the Indian Atomic Energy Commission in 1948. Surveys by the unit led to the discovery of uranium deposits in India.

=== Post Indian independence (1947-) ===
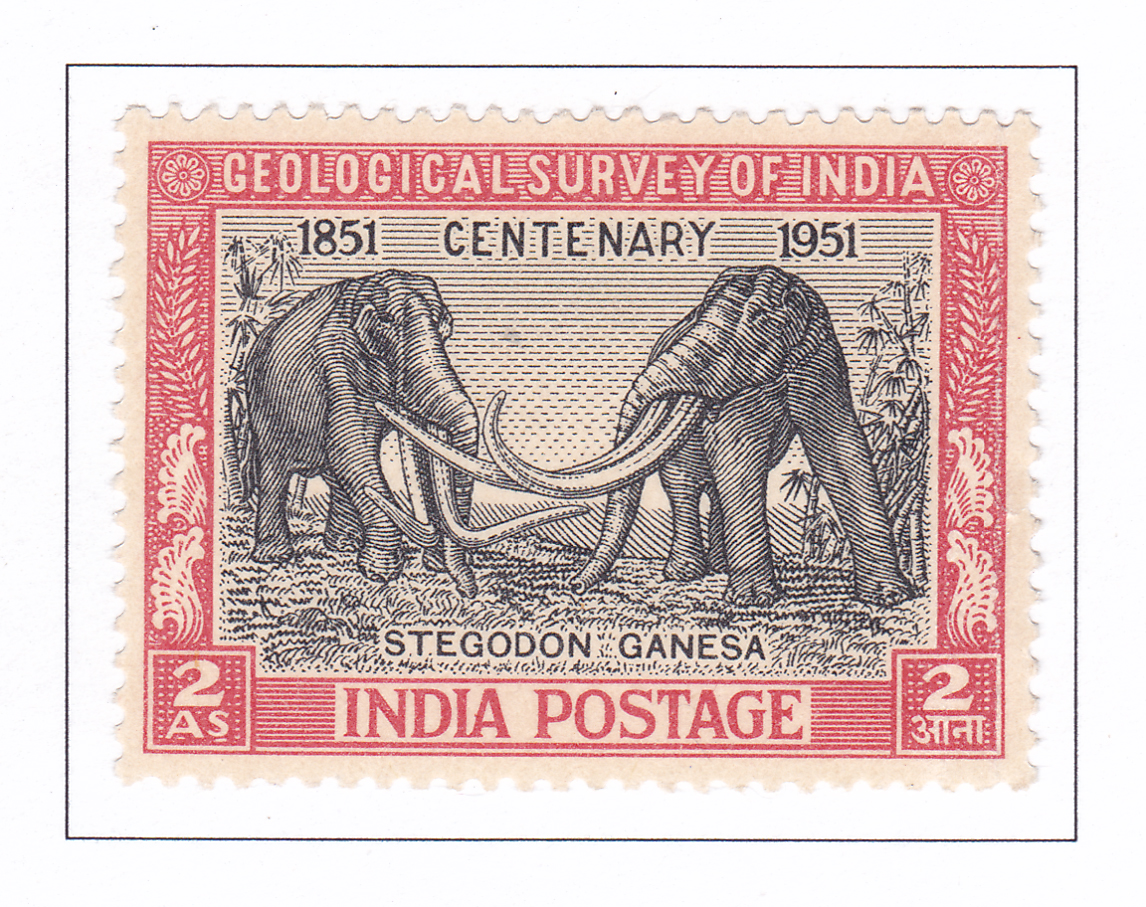
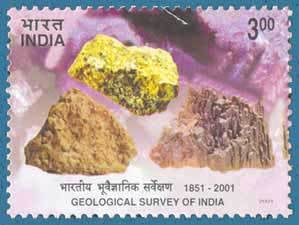
India Post stamps on the Geological Survey of India, released in 1951 (above) and 2001

In 1947, after the Partition of India, the Geological Survey of Pakistan took over the jurisdiction of the areas that became part of Pakistan, with Geological Survey of Bangladesh split from the same in 1971. William Dixon West, who was the director of the Geological Survey of India from 1945 to 1951, formulated a new five year plan for mapping of minerals and ground water in India. West and Wadia worked to promote various geo-scientific institutions. M.S. Krishnan became the first Indian director of the agency in 1951, and new divisions for drilling, engineering geology and ground water were created.

In 1961, the position of the head of the Geological Survey of India was changed to director general, with B. C. Roy, the first to occupy the position. A new decentralised regional structure was created and dedicated divisions were established for geophysics, marine geology, and airborne geophysical surveys were established. Further mineral discoveries of the agency led to the establishment of various public sector units. In 1970, the Central Geological Programming Board was established to research on plate tectonics. Coastal and offshore surveys began in 1983–84 with the induction of ocean-going and coastal research vessels.

Starting in the early 1980s, the Geological Survey of India was involved in several research expeditions. It was part of a global expedition in exploring the Indian Ocean. The agency was involved in the Indian Antarctic Programme beginning with the country's first expedition to Antarctica in 1981. India later established permanent research stations–Dakshin Gangotri (1983–84), Maitri (1989), and Bharati (2012) in the continent, which included staffs from the agency.

On 8 April 2017, the Geological Survey of India began a pilot project with the first ever aerial survey of mineral stocks upto a depth of 20 km (12 mi). In 2018, the agency was restructured into five divisions relating to baseline surveys, mineral resource assessments, geoinformatics, geosciences, and training and capacity building. In 2025, the agency ordered two dedicated coastal research vessels to be built by Garden Reach Shipbuilders & Engineers, the construction of which commenced in September 2026.

== List of heads ==
Sr. No.	Name	Period	Position
1	Thomas Oldham	1851–1876	Superindent
2	Henry Benedict Medlicott	1876–1885	Superindent
2	Henry Benedict Medlicott	1885–1887	Director
3	William King	1887–1894	Director
4	Carl Ludolf Griesbach	1894–1903	Director
5	Thomas Henry Holland	1903–1910	Director
6	Henry Hubert Hayden	1910–1921	Director
7	Edwin Hall Pascoe	1921–1932	Director
8	Lewis Leigh Fermor	1932–1935	Director
9	Alexander Heron	1935–1939	Director
10	Cyril Sankey Fox	1939–1943	Director
11	Edward Leslie Gilbert Clegg	1943–1944	Director
12	Henry Crookshank	1944–1945	Director
13	J.A. Dunn	1945	Director
14	William Dixon West	1945–1951	Director
15	M. S. Krishnan	1951–1955	Director
16	V. P. Sondhi	1955–1958	Director
17	B. C. Roy	1958–1961	Director
17	B. C. Roy	1961–1964	Director General
49	Ranjith Rath	2020–2021	Director General
50	R. S. Garkhal	2021–2022	Director General
51	S. Raju	2022–2023	Director General
52	Janardan Prasad	2023–2024	Director General
53	Asit Saha	2024–2026	Director General
54	Varsha Ashok Aglawe	2026	Director General
55	Dinesh Vitthalrao Ganvir	Incumbent	Director General

== See also ==
- List of National Geological Monuments in India
- Anthropological Survey of India – Indian anthropological organisation
- Archaeological Survey of India – Indian agency responsible for archaeological studies and preservation
- Botanical Survey of India – Indian governmental agency responsible for botanical research
- Zoological Survey of India – Indian governmental agency responsible for zoological research
