= Geology of Ireland =

Bedrock geological map of Ireland.

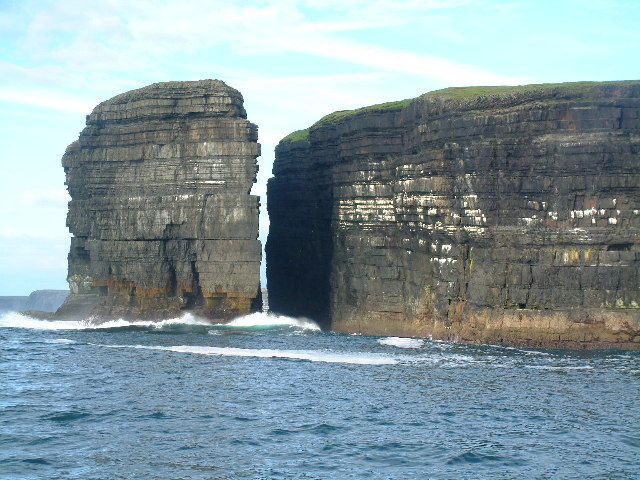
Layers of Upper Carboniferous (Namurian) sedimentary rocks, Loop Head, County Clare

The geology of Ireland consists of the study of the rock formations on the island of Ireland. It includes rocks from every age from Proterozoic to Holocene and a large variety of different rock types is represented. The basalt columns of the Giant's Causeway together with geologically significant sections of the adjacent coast have been declared a World Heritage Site. The geological detail follows the major events in Ireland's past based on the geological timescale.

== Timeline ==
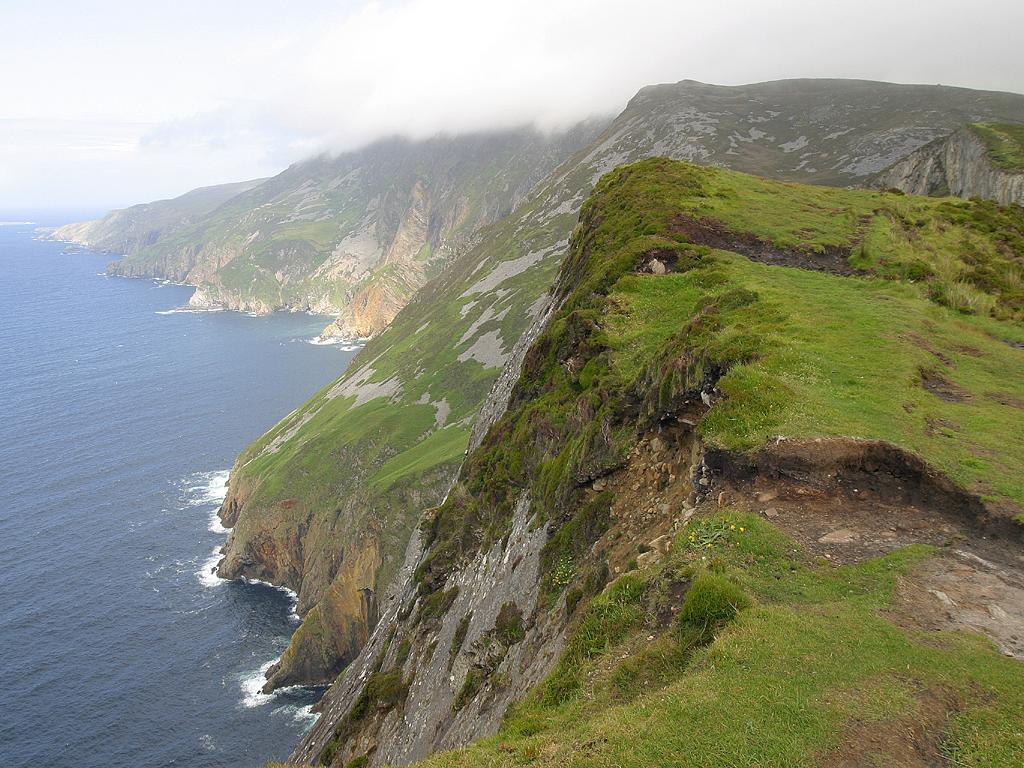
Slieve League in western Ulster

The oldest known Irish rock is about 1.8 billion years old and is found on Inishtrahull Island off the north coast of Ulster. Outcrops at Annagh Head on the Mullet Peninsula are almost as old. In other parts of Donegal, scientists have discovered rocks that originated as glacial deposits, demonstrating that at this early period, part of what was to become Ireland was in the grip of an ice age. However, because of the effects of later upheavals, it is almost impossible to sequence these early rock layers correctly.

About 600 million years ago, at the end of the Precambrian super-eon, what would later become the Irish landmass was in two parts, with one half on the north-western side of the Iapetus Ocean in Laurentia and the other on the south-eastern side in the micro-continent Avalonia, both at a latitude of around 80° South, close to what is now northwest Africa. From the evidence of the Oldhamia fossils found at Bray Head in Leinster, both parts of Ireland were below sea level at this time.

Over the next 150 million years, these two parts moved towards each other, eventually uniting about 440 million years ago. Fossils discovered near Clogherhead, County Louth, show the coming together of shoreline fauna from both sides of the original dividing ocean. The mountains of northwest Ireland were formed during the collision, as was the granite that is found in locations in Donegal and Wicklow. The Irish landmass was now above sea level and lying near the equator, and fossil traces of land-based life forms survive from this period. These include fossilised trees from Kiltorcan, County Kilkenny, widespread bony fish and freshwater mussel fossils and the footprints of a four-footed amphibian preserved in slate on Valentia Island in Munster. Old Red Sandstone also formed at this time.

Between 400 million and 300 million years ago, parts of Northwest Europe, including much of Ireland, sank beneath a warm tropical sea. Great coral reefs formed in these waters, eventually creating the limestone that still makes up about 65 per cent of the area of the island. As the waters receded, tropical forests and swamps flourished. The resulting vegetation eventually formed coal, most of which was later eroded. This period, known as the Carboniferous period, ended with further tectonic movement which saw Ireland drift further northward. The resulting pressure created those Irish mountain and hill ranges that run in a northeast to southwest direction.

=== Mesozoic ===
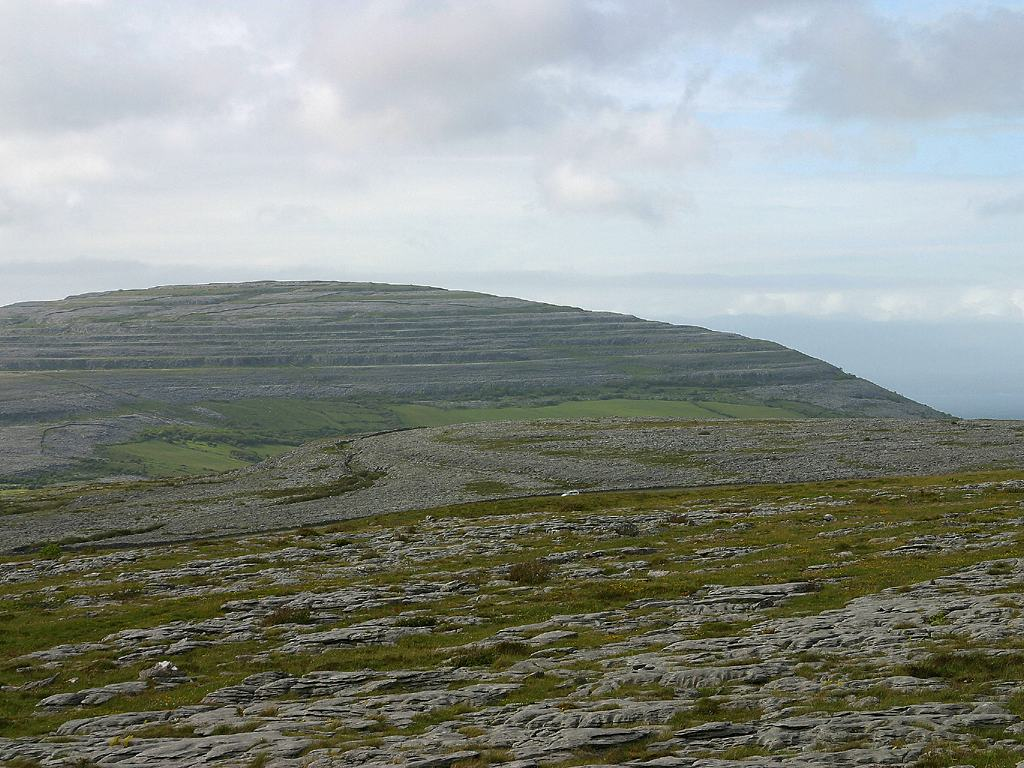
Karst landscape in the Burren

By 250 million years ago, Ireland was at the latitude of present-day Egypt and had a desert climate. It was at this time that most of the coal and sandstone were eroded. The thinner layers of limestone in the south of the country were also partially affected by this erosion. The limestone that was exposed by the disappearance of its sandstone mantle was subject to solution by weakly acidic water resulting in a karstic landscape that can still be seen in the Burren in County Clare. Shortly after this period, organic debris in the seas around Ireland began to form the natural gas and petroleum deposits that now play a role in the economy of Ireland. Then, about 150 million years ago, Ireland was again submerged, this time in a chalky sea that resulted in the formation of chalk over large parts of the surface. Traces of this survive under the basalt lava that is found in parts of the north.

About 66 million years ago, the volcanic activity that formed this lava began. The Mourne Mountains and other mountains in the northern part of the island formed as a result of this activity. Climatic conditions at this time were warm and vegetation thrived. Vegetable debris in the Antrim Depression formed deposits of brown coal or lignite which remain untouched. The warm conditions produced high rainfall that accelerated erosion and formed the karstic landscape.

=== Cenozoic ===
By 25 million years ago, Ireland was close to assuming its present position. From then on, a long period of erosion resulted in considerable soil formation mantling most of the bedrock. In areas with good drainage, the covering consisted of brown or grey soil, while in poorly drained areas, black clay tended to dominate. As the climate cooled, soil formation slowed, and a flora and fauna that would millions of years later be familiar to the first human inhabitants began to emerge. The present landscape of Ireland had more or less formed. Before the Quaternary glaciations the Irish landscape had a thick weathered regolith on the uplands and karst in the lowlands. Pre-Quaternary relief was more dramatic than today's smoothed landforms.

Since about 1.7 million years ago, the Earth has been subjected to a cycle of warm and cold stages and these have, inevitably, affected Ireland. The earliest evidence we have for this effect comes from the period known as the Ballylinian Warm Stage, some half a million years ago. At this time, most of what are now considered to be native Irish trees were already established on the island. The action of the ice during the cold stages was the major factor in bringing the Irish landscape to its current form.

Obvious impacts of the ice on the landscape include the formation of glacial valleys such as Glendalough in Wicklow and of corries, or glacial lakes. Mounds of debris deposited under the melting ice created drumlins, a common feature of the landscape across the north midlands. Streams also formed under the ice and the material deposited by these formed eskers (Irish eiscir). The greatest of these, the Esker Riada, divides the northern and southern halves of the island and its ridge once served as the main highway connecting the east and west coasts. About one half of the coastline consists of a low-lying dune pasture land known as machair.

== Rocks and soil types ==
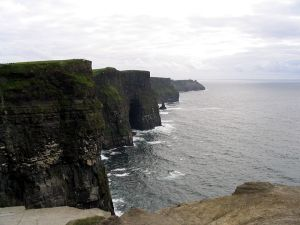
Layers of siltstone, shale and sandstone can be seen in the Cliffs of Moher, near Doolin in Munster

The large central lowland is of limestone covered with glacial deposits of clay and sand, with widespread bogs and lakes. The Bog of Allen is one of the largest bogs. The coastal mountains vary greatly in geological structure. In the south, the mountains are composed of Old Red Sandstone with limestone river valleys. Around the Ulster/Connacht border, the mountains are made from Carboniferous sandstones with softer Carboniferous limestones below them. In central Ulster, the mountains are predominantly made from metamorphic rocks. In the west of both Connacht and Ulster, the mountains are mostly metamorphic rocks with some granite. The Mourne and Wicklow Mountains are mainly granite. Much of the northeast of Ireland is a basalt plateau. An area of particular note is the Giant's Causeway on the north coast, a mainly basalt formation caused by volcanic activity between 50 and 60 million years ago. The basalts were originally part of the great Thulean Plateau formed during the Paleogene period.

The soils of the north and west tend to be poorly drained peats and gleys, including peaty podzols. In contrast, in the south and east the soils are free-draining brown earths and brown and grey-brown podzols.

An unusual environment is present in north Clare, in the Burren. This karst landscape consists of limestone bedrock, with little or no soil in the innermost areas. There are numerous sinkholes, where surface water disappears through the porous rock surface, and extensive cave systems have been formed in some areas. Doolin Cave is the site of one of the world's longest known free-hanging stalactites.
