= David Hiram Williams =

David Hiram Williams (1812–1848) was a Welsh geological surveyor who created the first maps credited to the Geological Survey of India.

David H. Williams (Note: David was the only name given at baptism, and was not expanded in his signature. Indeed, use of 'Hiram' has led to confusion with a younger brother of that name.) was born in Llangyfelach, Swansea, on 5 October 1812, the second son of David William and Hannah. His father had progressed from being a labourer to mineral surveying, and the help father and his son gave William Logan with mapping coal in the Swansea area was probably a large factor in Henry de la Beche's decision in 1839 to make D.H.Williams his first employee for the Ordnance Geological Survey. D.H.Williams is acknowledged as sole or joint surveyor on numerous 1st edition geological maps and sections of England and Wales, from Pembrokeshire to Somerset, and Flintshire to Shropshire.

At the end of 1845, Williams was engaged by the East India Company as 'Surveyor of coal districts and superintendent of coal works, Bengal' (between Calcutta and Benares). In 1847 he introduced Joseph Hooker to travelling in India.

On 4 February 1848, Williams was appointed the "Geological Surveyor of the Geological Survey of India". He died of fever at Hazareebaugh on 15 November 1848.

Williams published a map, plus horizontal and vertical sections, of the Damoodah coalfield in December 1847. Detailed reports of his work in India, with recommendations for introducing iron works, were published posthumously in London and then Calcutta.
