= Robert Mallet =

Irish geophysicist (1810–1881)

Robert Mallet FRS MRIA
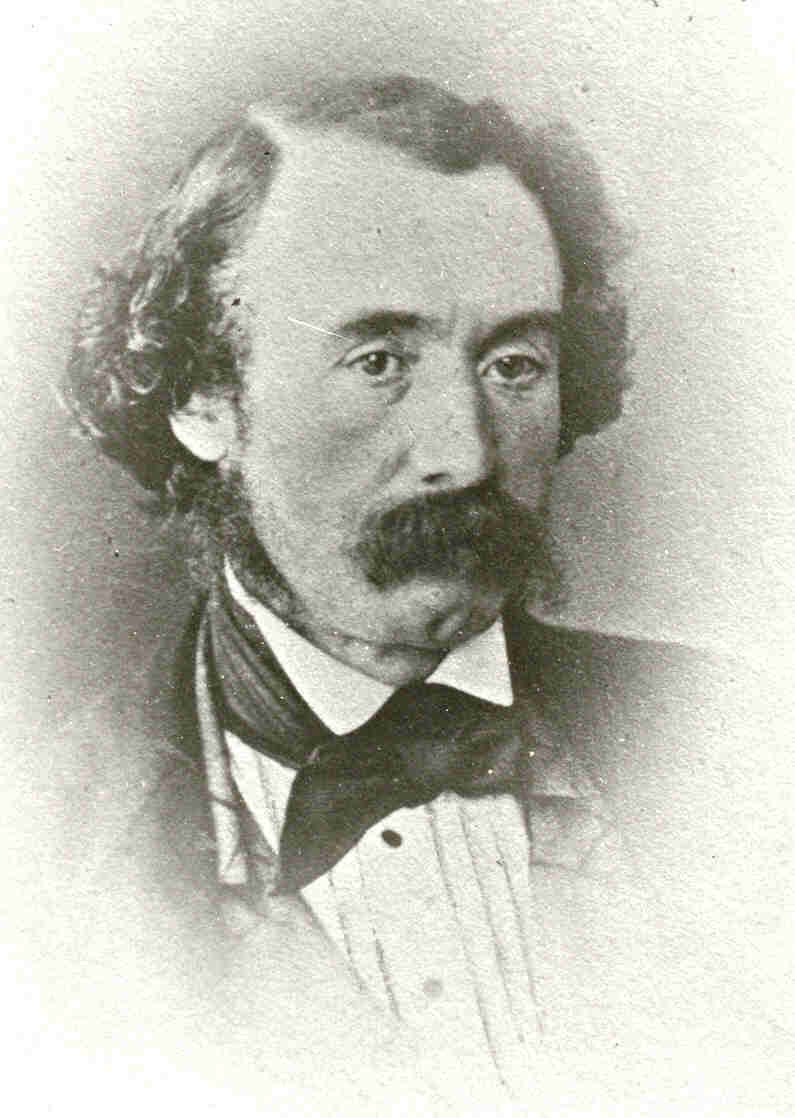
- Born: 3 June 1810; Dublin, Ireland
- Died: 5 November 1881 (aged 71); Stockwell, London, England
- Resting place: West Norwood Cemetery, London
- Education: Trinity College Dublin (B.Sc., 1830)
- Known for: Foundational work in seismology
- Children: John Mallet; Frederick Richard Mallet
- Awards: FRS (1854); Telford Medal (1859); Cunningham Medal (1862); Wollaston Medal (1877)
- Scientific career
- Fields: Geophysics, Engineering
- Workplaces: British Association for the Advancement of Science; Royal Geological Society of Ireland; Royal Society

Robert Mallet FRS MRIA (3 June 1810 – 5 November 1881) was an Irish geophysicist, civil engineer, and inventor who distinguished himself by pioneering research concerning earthquakes, and is sometimes regarded as the "father of seismology." For his major foundational work in seismology, he received the Telford Medal in 1859, the Cunningham Medal in 1862, and the Wollaston Medal in 1877. He became a member of the Royal Geological Society of Ireland in 1838, and a fellow of the Royal Society in 1854.

Mallet began his career as an apprentice in his father's iron foundry company and grew the family business into one of the largest engineering firms in Ireland. He started researching in the study of earthquakes during his time at various academies, including the Royal Irish Academy in 1832, and the British Association for the Advancement of Science in 1835. His son, Frederick Richard Mallet, was also a geologist who worked in India.

He retired in the 1870s, after becoming blind for the last seven years of his life, and died near London in 1881. He was buried at West Norwood Cemetery.

== Early life ==
Mallet was born in Dublin, on 3 June 1810, the son of factory owner John Mallet. He was educated at Trinity College, Dublin, entering it at the age of 16 and graduating in science and mathematics in 1830 at the age of 20.

== Career ==
After his graduation, he joined his father's iron foundry business and helped build the business into one of the most important engineering works in Ireland, supplying ironwork for railway companies, the Fastnet Rock lighthouse, and a swing bridge over the River Shannon at Athlone. He also helped manufacture the characteristic iron railings that surround Trinity College and which bear his family name at the base.

Mallet was elected to the Royal Irish Academy in 1832 at the early age of 22. He also enrolled in the British Association for the Advancement of Science in 1835 which helped finance much of his research of seismology.

In 1838 he became a life member of the Royal Geological Society of Ireland, and acted as its president from 1846–48. From 1848 to 1849 he managed the construction of the Fastnet Rock lighthouse, southwest of Cape Clear.

=== Seismological work ===
On 9 February 1846 he presented to the Royal Irish Academy his paper, "On the Dynamics of Earthquakes", which is considered to be one of the origins of modern seismology. He is also credited with inventing the word "seismology" and some related words, e.g. the isoseismal map, which he used for his research. He also invented the term epicentre.

From 1852 to 1858, he was prepared (with his son, John William Mallet) his work, The Earthquake Catalogue of the British Association (1858), and performed blasting experiments to determine the speed of seismic propagation in sand and solid rock.

On 16 December 1857, the area around Padula, Italy, was devastated by the Great Neapolitan earthquake which caused 11,000 deaths. At the time it was the third largest known earthquake in world history and has been estimated to have been of magnitude 7.0 on the Moment magnitude scale. Mallet, with letters of endorsement from Charles Lyell and Charles Darwin, petitioned the Royal Society of London and received a grant of £150 to go to Padula and record the devastation personally. The resulting report was presented to the Royal Society as the Report on the Great Neapolitan Earthquake of 1857. It was a major scientific work and made great use of the then new process of photography to record the devastation caused by the earthquake. In 1862, he published the "Great Neapolitan Earthquake of 1857: The First Principles of Observational Seismology" in two volumes; he brought forward evidence to show that the depth below the Earth's surface, from where the impulse of the Neapolitan earthquake originated, was about 8–9 geographical miles.

One of Mallet's papers was Volcanic Energy: an Attempt to develop its True Origin and Cosmical Relations, in which he sought to show that volcanic heat may be attributed to the effects of crushing, contortion and other disturbances in the crust of the earth; the disturbances resulting in the formation of lines of fracture, more or less vertical, down which water would find its way, and if the temperature generated be sufficient volcanic eruptions of steam or lava would follow.

=== Other work ===
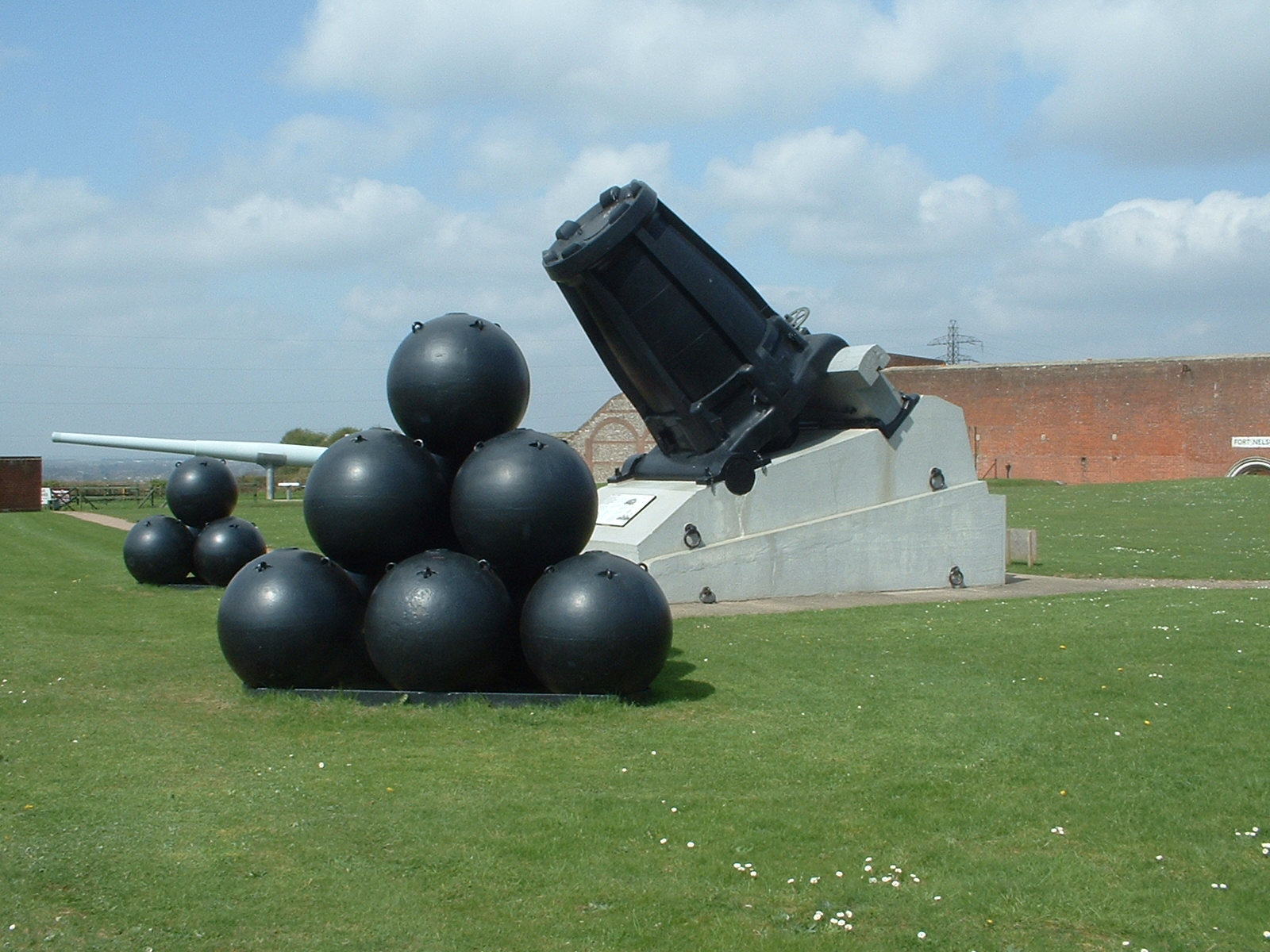
Mallet's Mortar with 36-inch shells which would have contained 480 lb (217 kg) of gunpowder.

During the Crimean War he designed a 42-long-ton (43 t) mortar of 36 inches (910 mm) calibre capable of throwing a 2,400 pounds (1,100 kg) shell a distance of 1.5 miles (2.4 km). The huge mortar was built in sections to allow transport, but was too late to be used in action. An example has been preserved at the Royal Artillery base in Woolwich and one is displayed before the Royal Armouries Fort Nelson near Portsmouth.

Mallet was elected Fellow of the Royal Society in 1854, and in 1861 relocated to London, where he became a consulting engineer and edited The Practical Mechanic's Journal. He was awarded the Telford Medal by the Institution of Civil Engineers in 1859, followed by the Cunningham Medal of the Royal Irish Academy for his research into the theory of earthquakes in 1862 and the Wollaston medal of the Geological Society of London in 1877, the Geological Society's greatest award.

Between 1840 and 1852 Mallet designed a buckled iron plate to be used as buckled-plate flooring base to the road surface of bridges. In the 1860s he also introduced buckled railway sleepers.

Blind for the last seven years of his life, he died at Stockwell, London, on 5 November 1881 and is buried at West Norwood Cemetery.
