= E. L. G. Clegg =

British geologist (1849–1944)

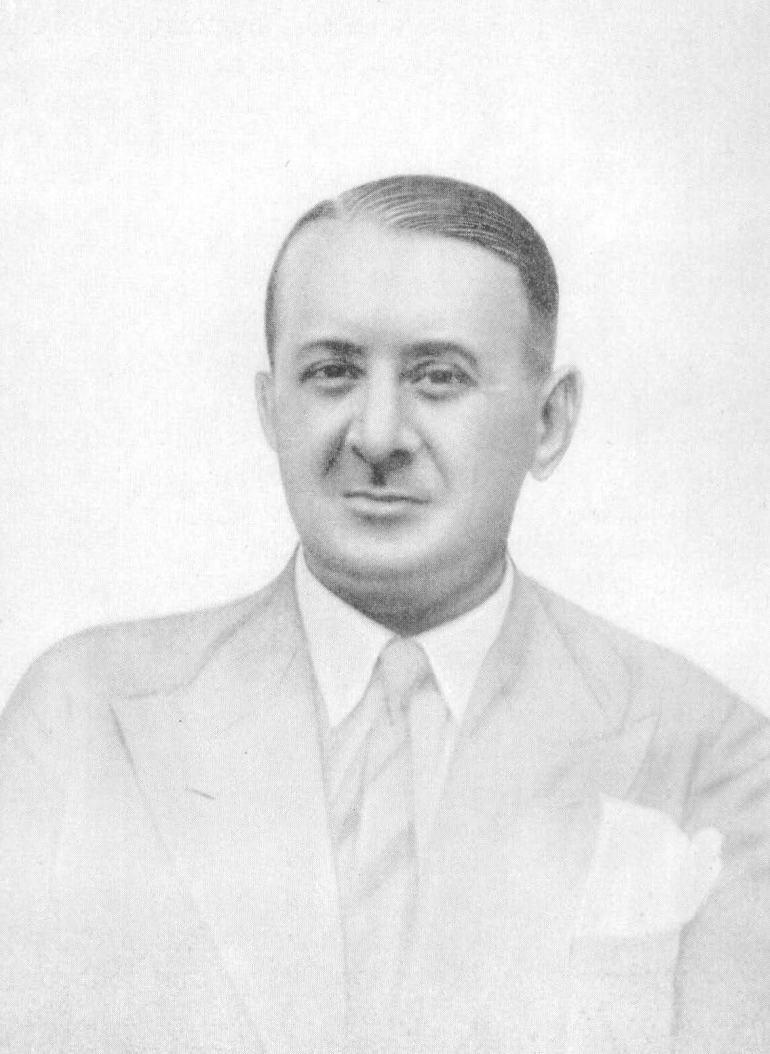

Edward Leslie Gilbert Clegg (24 February 1894 – 8 September 1944) was a British geologist who served in the Geological Survey of India. He served as the director of the Geological Survey from 1943 until his death.

== Life and work ==
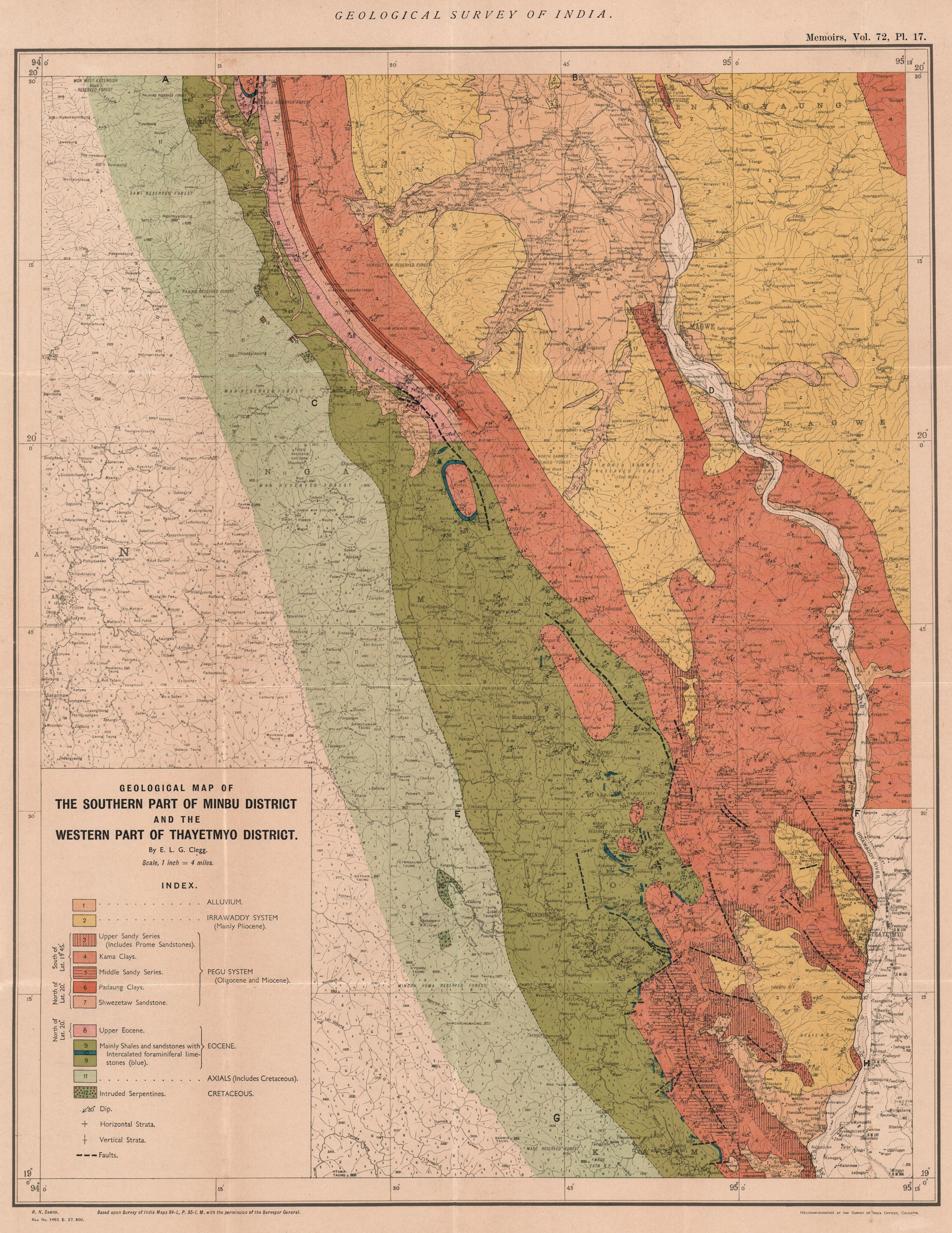
Clegg's map of the geology of Burma, 1930

Clegg was born in Crumpsall, Manchester and went to the Central High School before joining Victoria University in 1912. He served during World War I from 1914 in France and Italy with the Northumberland Fusilliers. He returned to Manchester and completed his MSc degree in geology in 1920 before joining the Geological Survey of India. He worked in the Central Provinces, Baluchistan and Burma. He was also involved in teaching at the Mining and Geological Institute of India and at the Presidency College, Calcutta. In 1939 he received a DSc from Manchester. He served in the Government of Burma from 1937 and returned to India in 1942 during the Japanese invasion. He studied the geology of Burma extensively and published a number of papers. He identified the ruby bearing limestone zones of Mogok as Cretaceous.

Clegg married Helen Goode in 1926 and they had two sons. He died following a surgery at Calcutta.

== Publications ==
Clegg's chief works were on the geology of Burma.

- 1922. Note on the Kunghka and Manmaklang Iron Ore deposits, Northern Shan States, Burma. Rec. geol. Surv. India, 54:431-435.
- 1928. Note on Geological Traverse in the Yunzalin Valley. Rec. geol. Surv. India, 60:192-302.
- 1928. The Ambala Boring of 1926–27. Rec. geol. Surv. India, 60:303-307.
- 1930. Miscellaneous Notes: Indian Beryl. Rec. geol. Surv. India, 62:290-291.
- 1930. The geology of the Minbu and Thayetmyo districts, Burma. Mem. geol. Surv. India, 72:137-317.
- 1933. Note on an Overlap in the Ngape Area, Minbu district. Rec. geol. Surv. India, 66:250-254.
- 1933. Echinoidea of the Persian Gulf. Palaeobot. India, 22, 1-35.
- 1937. Notes on the Geology of the Second Defile of the Irrawaddy River. Rec. geol. Surv. India. 71:350-359.
- 1937. Note on rocks in the vicinity of Kyaukse, Burma. Rec. geol. Surv. India, 71:376-379.
- 1940. Mineral Deposits of Burma. Govt. Ptg. Stationery Office, Burma.
- 1941. The Cretaceous and Associated Rocks of Burma. Mem. geol. Surv. India, 74:1-102.
- 1941. Introduction to G. V. Hobson's Report on a Geological Survey in parts of Karenni and the Southern Shan States. Mem. geol. Surv. India, 74:103-155.
- 1944. Tin and Wolfram. Rec. geol. Surv. India, 76:1-168.
- 1954. The Mergui, Moulmein and Mawchi Series. Rec. geol. Surv. India, 78:155-300.
- 1954. A traverse from Padaung to the Taungap Pass in the Prome district, Burma. Rec. geol. Surv. India, 78:155-300.
