= Cyril Sankey Fox =

British geologist in India (1886–1951)

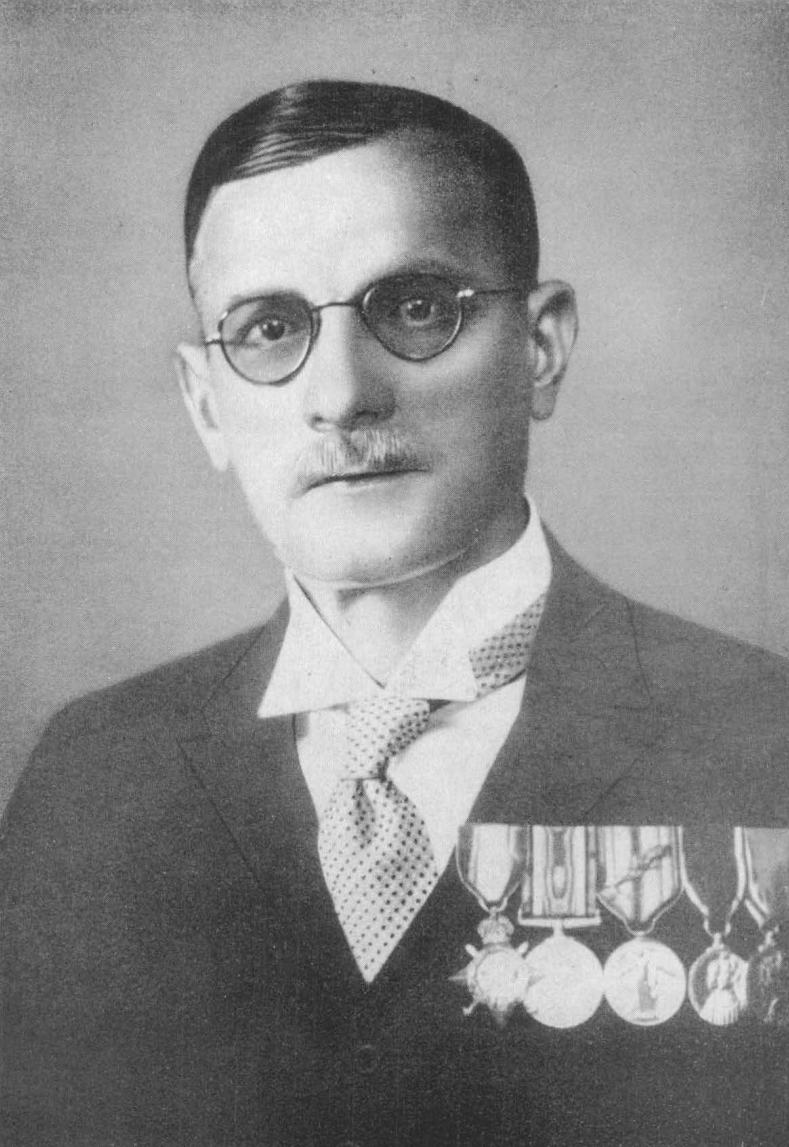

Sir Cyril Sankey Fox (24 February 1886 – 28 December 1951) was an English mining engineer and geologist who worked in India. He served as director of the Geological Survey of India from 1939 until his retirement in 1943. He was knighted shortly before his retirement.

== Biography ==
Fox was born in Calcutta, the son of John Henry Neat Fox and was educated at the Sibpur Civil Engineering College and then at the University of Birmingham receiving a BSc in mining (1908). He then worked at the Cannock Chase Colliery and taught briefly at the University of Birmingham. He joined the Geological Survey of India in 1911 and became a director in 1939. During World War I, he served with the Royal Engineers at the Battle of Loos (1915) and lost much of his hearing from a shell explosion. In India, he was involved in the management of mica mines in Joasimar, Bihar, surveys for bauxite and coal. During World War II, he had several old mines reopened including the Zawar lead and zinc mines. He was knighted in 1943 and after an extension, retired on 1 July 1943.

Fox married Mabel Janet Dunn in 1916. He died at Calcutta.
