= Alexander Heron =

Scottish geologist and explorer

Alexander Heron FGS FRGS FRSE
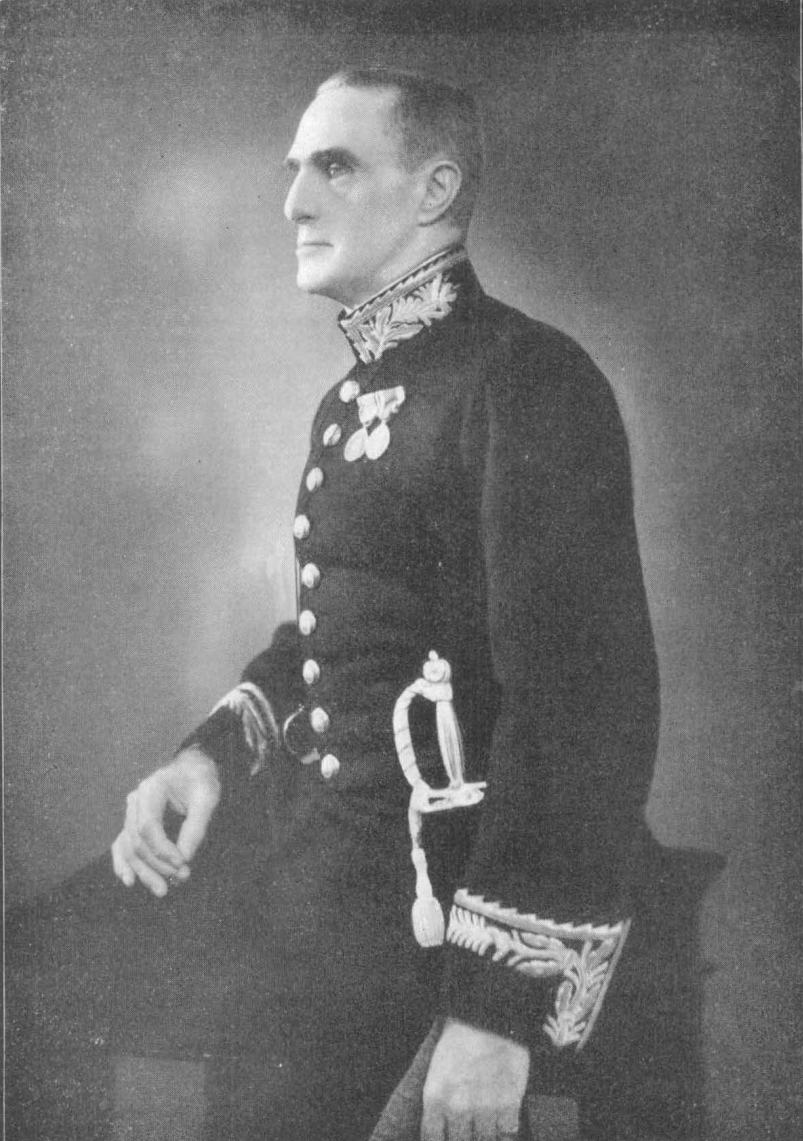
- Heron in ceremonial uniform
- Born: Alexander Macmillan Heron; 31 July 1884; Edinburgh, Scotland
- Died: 1971 (aged 86); Tamil Nadu
- Occupation: Geologist
- Known for: 1921 Mount Everest expedition

Alexander Macmillan Heron (31 July 1884 – 1971) was a Scottish geologist who became Director of the Geological Survey of India. He participated in the 1921 British Mount Everest reconnaissance expedition following which he produced a geological map of the Everest region of Tibet.

== Early life and professional career ==
Alexander Heron was born in Duddingston, Edinburgh on 31 July 1884, son of William Heron, a coal agent for William Baird & Co of Garthsherrie, who later became a macer (court usher), and Joan Heron, née Macmillan. He graduated from University of Edinburgh in engineering in 1906 and in that year he joined the Geological Survey of India. In 1911, in South Stoneham, Hampshire, he married Margaret Kirsopp of Musselburgh and in 1915 they had a daughter, Marjorie Edgware Heron. Returning to study at the University of Edinburgh, he was granted his D.Sc. in 1919. He was elected fellow of the Royal Society of Edinburgh in 1925 and, succeeding Sir Lewis Leigh Fermor, he became the Survey's director in 1936 until stepping down from that post in 1939. From 1934 to 1937 he was president of the Calcutta Geographical Society (which in 1951 became the Geographical Society of India). In 1948 Heron was geological advisor for Hyderabad, where he became a mentor to the young Calamur Mahadevan. He continued publishing research papers for the Geological Survey into the 1950s and, after 23 years of geological survey in Rajasthan he published his magnum opus, "The Geology of Central Rajasthan", in 1953. He died in 1971 aged 86 while he was staying in the Nilgiri Hills of southern India.

== Mount Everest regional geological survey ==
=== 1921 expedition ===
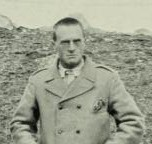
Alexander Heron on the 1921 Everest expedition

==== Background ====
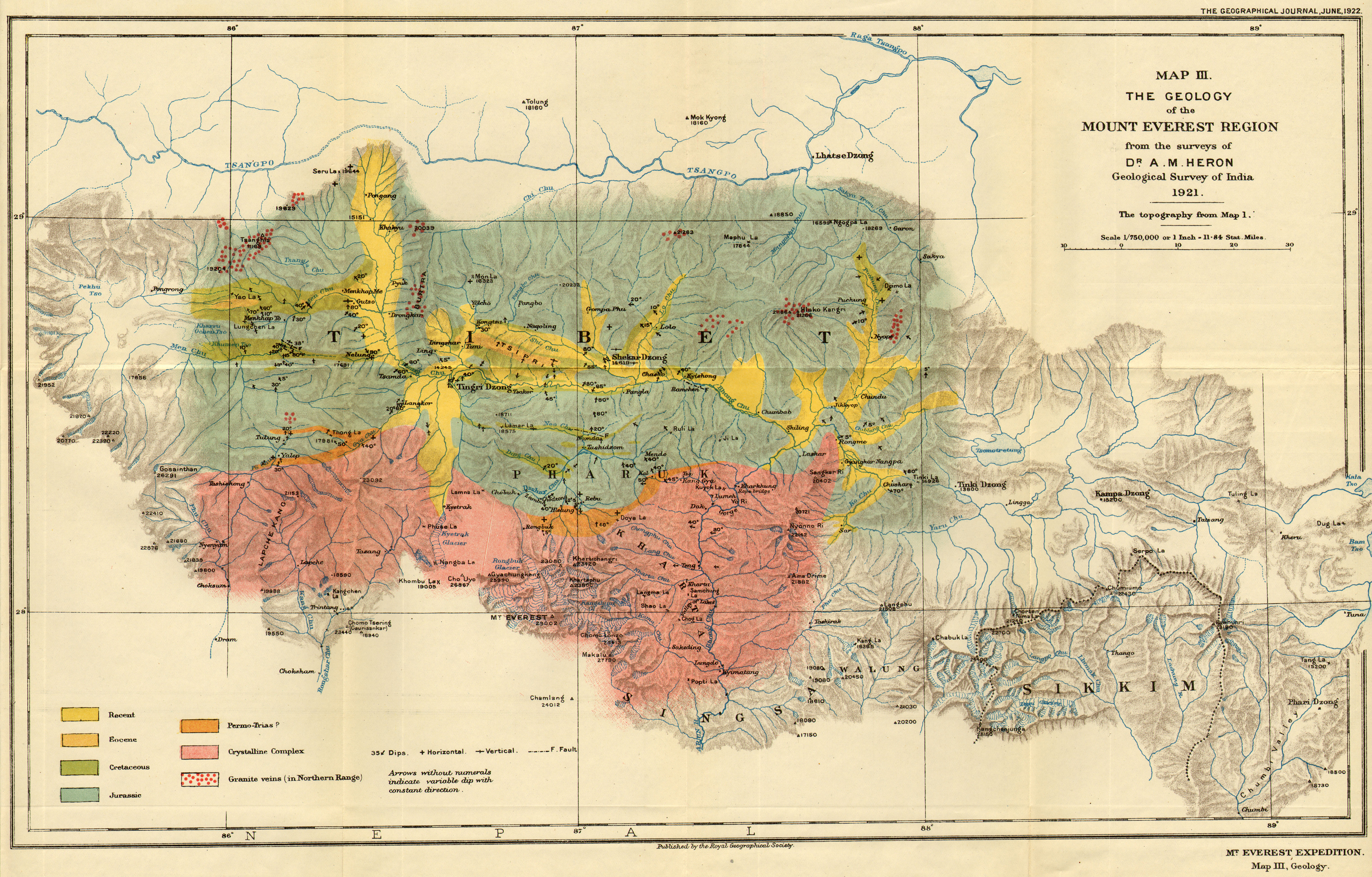
Heron's geological map of Everest region

The 1921 Everest reconnaissance expedition was funded by the Royal Geographical Society, the Alpine Club and the Survey of India with a remit to explore the approaches to Mount Everest from Sikkim and through Tibet, and to investigate possible routes for climbing the mountain. Reaching the summit was not a primary objective. For geographical survey work the Survey of India appointed its own officers and the Geological Survey of India appointed Heron to conduct a widespread geological survey and to produce a map. Charles Howard-Bury led the expedition. Harold Raeburn and Alexander Kellas were to lead the climbing team but, after Kellas' sudden death on the walk-in, and Raeburn's illness requiring him to return to base, George Mallory effectively became lead climber. Henry Morshead led the survey work.

==== Heron's travels ====
Heron's party left Darjeeling on 19 May 1921. To begin with Mallory had found Heron dull in conversation but in the course of the long trek across the Tibetan Plateau he formed a much better opinion. In letters home to his wife Ruth he wrote that Heron was a "solid treasure", was "cheerful and good-natured", and that although he was good at dealing with the porters he was no climber. Later, while exploring north of Everest, Mallory's photographs with one camera were ruined because he had been putting in the photographic plates back to front. Writing home he blamed Heron for not instructing him properly.

Starting from the expedition's base at Tingri on 25 June, Heron set off south west towards the Kyetrak Glacier with Oliver Wheeler. Howard-Bury joined them later and while Wheeler surveyed on his own, they explored the area of the Nangpa La where Heron discovered marine fossils in the limestone at heights never thought possible. (Note: They also knew it as the Khumbu Pass.) By 4 July they had moved to see Mallory and Guy Bullock in the Rongbuk valley and then they headed on north and then east to find a suitable base from which to explore the eastern approaches to Everest. They decided the Kharta valley was suitable. Heron separately surveyed from Kharta back to Tingri and went on to make several geological expeditions to the north. He returned to Kharta on 19 August after exploring, in very bad weather, a broad east-west region as far north as the Yarlung Tsangpo River. Heron visited the main party at Kharta on 14 September and then set off to explore Everest's eastern valleys taking no part in reaching the Lhakpa La and, beyond, the North Col.

For Heron the expedition ended on 20 October when the group he was with arrived back in Darjeeling. Largely working alone, he had made geological investigations over 8,000 square miles (21,000 km^{2}) and had produced the promised geological map. He also wrote the geological chapter for Howard-Bury's book about the expedition.

==== Geological results ====
Heron based his map on the topographical map that was being drawn by Morshead and his team, although for much of the time the region he was in had not yet been mapped so he had to transcribe his observations later. The scale was four miles to an inch (1:250,000). Heron discovered that the Tibetan plateau was intensely folded sedimentary Jurassic shale and Cretaceous limestone with an east-west strike with, he considered, the folding indicating movement from the north. The uppermost limestone, Cretaceous and later, contained fossils but the shale had little by way of fossils. Nearer to the mountains the shale was underlain by limestone (possibly Triassic or Jurassic) metamorphosed into crystalline form and into calcareous gneiss. In the vicinity of the high mountains the rock was biotite gneiss. The high peaks north west of Everest had granite intrusions and possibly the same would apply on Everest itself. He considered that the biotite gneiss was probably an igneous intrusion into the calcareous gneiss. There were no ores or minerals of commercial interest.

The region surveyed was in Tibet from the Tsangpo in the north down to the Nepalese border. It included the basin of the Arun River, the region north and east of Everest, and in the west the headwaters of the Bhote Koshi flowing into Nepal. Heron considered that a river had once flowed east–west just north of Himalaya, possibly joining the Tsangpo as a tributary. The Arun River flows southwards between Everest and Kangchenjunga and he thought that its headwaters had cut backwards and to the north until the east–west river had been captured in the middle of its course. The Arun Gorge is 5,000 feet (1,500 m) deep as it cuts completely through the Himalayan ridge and for the origin of its upper part Heron was "unable to give an explanation". (Note: It is now known to be an "antecedent drainage stream" as first suggested by Lawrence Wager following the 1933 British Mount Everest expedition.)

==== Complaint from Lhasa ====
While the expedition was underway, on 28 September 1921, Charles Bell, who was in Sikkim as the British diplomatic representative to Tibet, received a telegram from the Tibetan prime minister passing on a complaint from the dzongpen of Shekar. The expedition had disturbed the monks at Rongbuk Monastery and, moreover, climbers had been digging up rubies, turquoises and other precious stones.

It was agreed that Mount Everest might be explored but if this is used as an excuse for digging earth and stones from the most sacred hills of Tibet, inhabited by fierce demons, the very guardians of the soil, fatal epidemics may break out amongst men and cattle. Kindly prevent officials wandering about and effect their early return.

Bell knew that no precious stones had been found but he was well attuned to Tibet culture and sympathetic with it so he understood the sensitivities. To make matters worse, a scarlet fever epidemic had indeed broken out in Tibet in late 1921.

Heron's explanation was not helpful:

I have to plead "Not Guilty" to the charge of being a Disturber of Demons. I did no mining and the gentle hammer tapping which I indulged in was, I am sure, insufficient to alarm the most timid of the fraternity. Perhaps it was Wheeler through his cairn-building propensity! However this time I shall exorcise them by the pious refrain of "kiki so so lha so lha" to a hammer accompaniment.

Bell was infuriated and no official geologist, and certainly not Heron, would ever take part in an Everest expedition again. Moreover, officers of the Survey of India were also to be excluded. (Note: Henry Morshead, of the Survey of India, took part as a surveyor in 1921 and was allowed in as a member of the climbing party in 1922. However, the latter was not in his professional capacity but and a private individual.)

=== 1922 expedition ===
The Survey of India nominated Heron to accompany the 1922 expedition as geologist even though the Tibetan authorities had refused permission. Frederick Bailey (who in 1913 with Morshead, had explored the Tsangpo Gorge) had replaced Charles Bell as Britain's political advisor for Tibet and he continued with Bell's decision not to allow geologists. (Note: Bailey had himself made secretive visits to Tibet in earlier years.) So, even though Heron joined the party at Kalimpong hoping for a last-minute reprieve, the Foreign Office in London, not wanting to cause diplomatic difficulty, instructed Charles Bruce, the leader of the expedition, not to allow Heron to participate – he had to return to Darjeeling. Despite all this Heron's discoveries were to be the foundation for the unofficial later work of Noel Odell on the 1924 expedition and Lawrence Wager on the 1933 expedition.
