= Oldhamia =

Oldhamia Temporal range: Fortunian–Wuliuan

Trace fossil classification
- Ichnogenus: †Oldhamia; Forbes, 1848

Ichnospecies
- Oldhamia radiata Forbes, 1848; Oldhamia antiqua Forbes, 1848; Oldhamia flabellata Aceñolaza et Durand, 1973; Oldhamia curvata Lindholm et Casey, 1990; Oldhamia geniculata Seilacher, Buatois et Mangano, 2005; Oldhamia alata Seilacher, Buatois et Mangano, 2005

Trace fossil

Oldhamia is an ichnogenus describing burrows produced by worm-like organisms mining underneath microbial mats. It was common from the Early Cambrian deep-water deposits.

The Ediacaran species Oldhamia recta are body fossils of a rod-like organism, rather than ichnofossils.

The Ordovician Oldhamia pinnata and Carboniferous-Permian Oldhamia fimbriata were mentioned without any ichnotaxonomical formalization, and therefore are nomina nuda.

It was named after the geologist Thomas Oldham by Edward Forbes, who first described it in 1848.

== See also ==
- List of Ediacaran genera
