= Thomas Oldham =

Anglo-Irish geologist

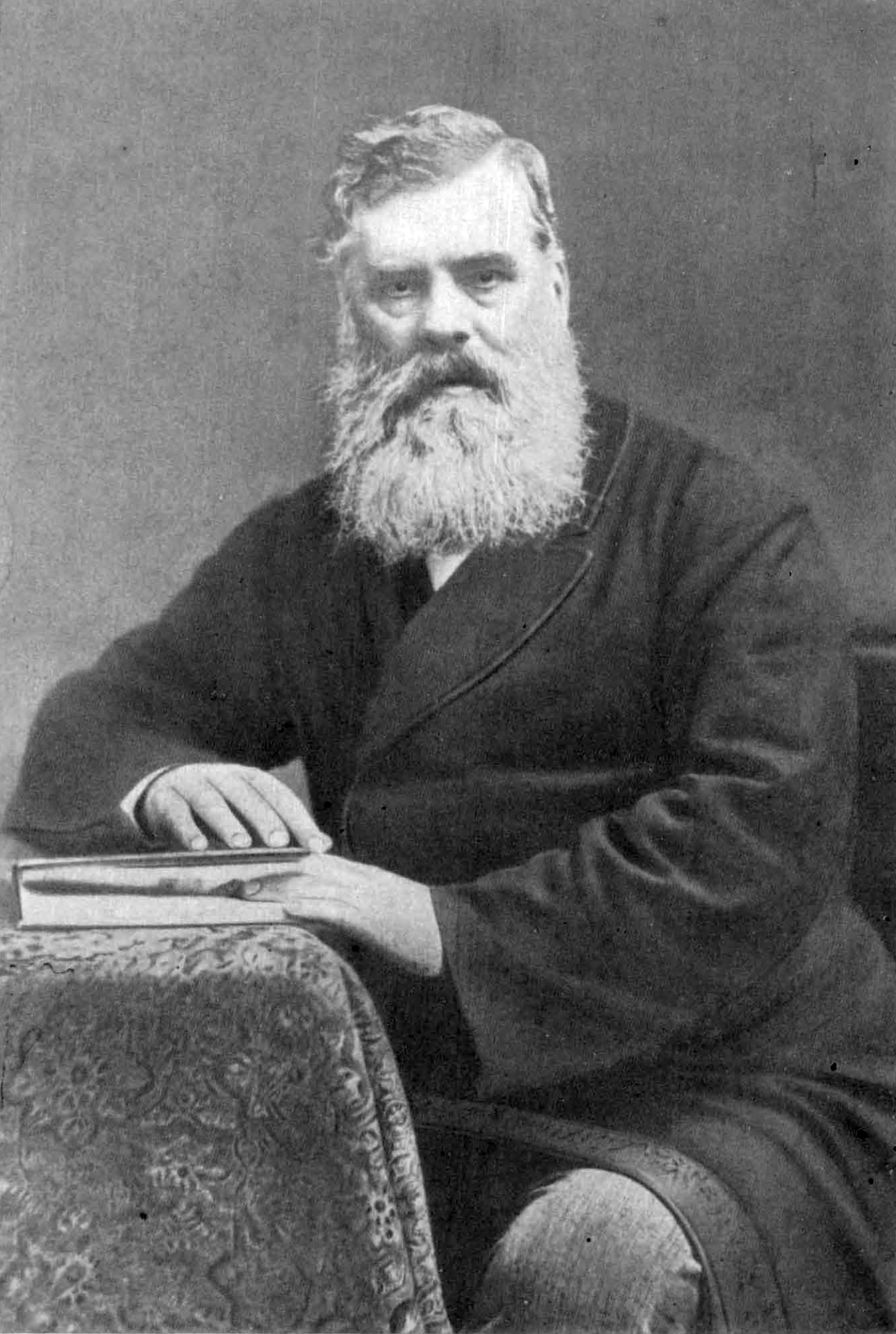
- Thomas Oldham
- Born: 4 May 1816; Dublin
- Died: 17 July 1878 (aged 62); Rugby
- Known for: mineral Oldhamite
- Scientific career
- Fields: Geology

Thomas Oldham (4 May 1816, Dublin – 17 July 1878, Rugby) was an Anglo-Irish geologist.

== Early life ==
Thomas was born at Dublin on 4 May 1816 as the eldest son of Thomas Oldham and his wife, Margaret Bagot. Educated at a private schools, he began residency at Trinity College, Dublin before the age of 16. By spring 1836, he started his B.A. and later studied civil engineering at the University of Edinburgh as well as geology under Robert Jameson. They became intimate friends. After two years in Scotland, he returned to Dublin. He married Louisa Matilda Dixon of Liverpool in 1850.

== Geology ==
In 1838 he joined the ordnance survey in Ireland as a chief assistant under Joseph Ellison Portlock who was studying the geology of Londonderry and neighbourhood. Portlock wrote of him

whenever I have required his aid … I have found him possessed of the highest intelligence and the most unbounded zeal

He discovered radiating fans shaped impressions in the town of Bray in 1840. He showed this to the English palaeontologist Edward Forbes, who named it Oldhamia after him. Forbes declared them to be bryozoans, however later workers ascribed it to other plants and animals. For a while these were considered the oldest fossils in the world.

He became Curator to the Geological Society of Dublin, and in 1845 succeeded John Phillips, nephew of William Smith, in the Chair of Geology at Trinity College, Dublin. He was elected a Fellow of the Royal Society in June 1848.

== Career in India ==
He resigned as the Curator to the Geological Society of Dublin in November 1850 and took a position as the first Superintendent of the Geological Survey of India. He was the first Irish geologists to migrate to the subcontinent. He was followed by his brother Charles, William King Jr. (son of William King, the Professor of Geology at Queen's College, Galway), Valentine Ball, and more than 12 other Irish geologists.

In India he oversaw a mapping programme that focussed on coal bearing strata. The team of geologists made major discoveries. Henry Benedict Medlicott coined the term "Gondwana Series" in 1872. Oldham's elder son Richard Dixon Oldham distinguished three types of pressure produced by earthquakes: now known as P (compressional), S (shear), and L (Love)-waves, based on his observations made after the Great Assam Earthquake of 1897. Richard showed in 1906 the arrival patterns of waves and suggested that the core of the earth was liquid. His younger son Henry became a reader in geography at King's College, Cambridge.

He also started the Paleontologia Indica, a series of memoirs on the fossils of India. For this work, he recruited Ferdinand Stoliczka from Europe.

== Later days ==
Oldham resigned from his position in India in 1876 on the grounds of poor health and retired to Rugby in England. In recognition of his lifetime's "long & important services in the science of geology", including Palaeontographica Indica, he was awarded the Royal Society's Royal Medal. He died in Rugby on 17 July 1878.
