= William King (GSI) =

Son of English-born geologist William King

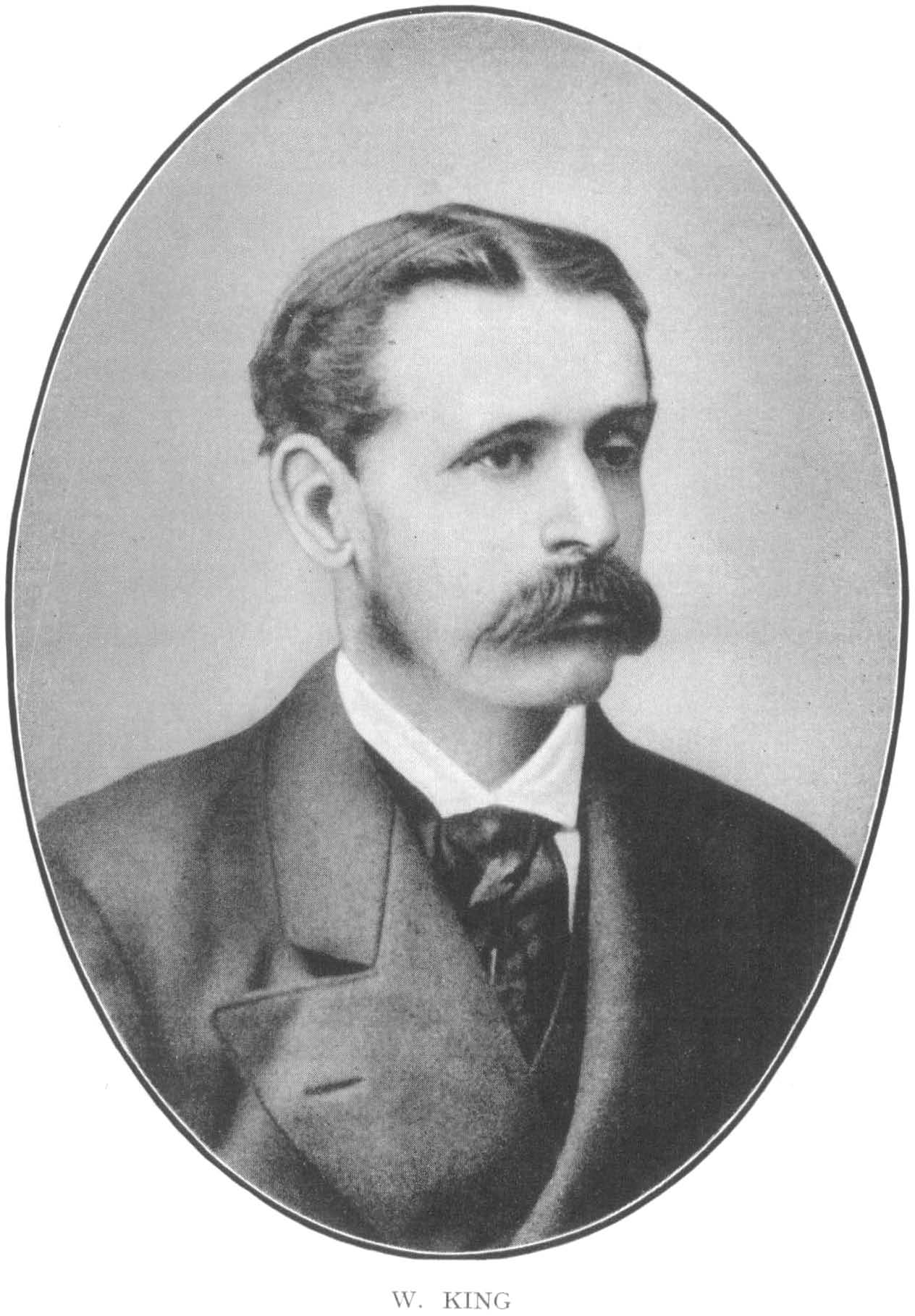

William King FGS (1834? - 1900) was the son of the English-born geologist William King who also became a geologist and worked in India with the Geological Survey of India, serving as its director from 1887 to 1894.

King studied civil engineering at Queen's College, Galway and at Queen's University before joining the Geological Survey of India on 4 March 1857. His first work was in southern India with H.F.Blanford. He then worked in central India and surveyed western Chota Nagpur and took over the position of director at Calcutta, succeeding Medlicott in 1887. He was given six extensions from the normal age of retirement at 54 thus retiring at the age of 60 on 16 July 1894 after 37 years of service. He was succeeded by Carl Griesbach as director as the next senior officer T.W.H. Hughes was injured, losing his eyesight and being forced to retire.

== Publications ==
King published numerous reports as part of his work in the Geological Survey of India and numerous notes in its Records and Memoirs. The key emphasis was on surveys for coal and mineral resources. A partial list of publications include:

- King, W. (1888) Boring exploration in the Chhattisgarh Coal-fields Records of the Geological Survey of India. 20:194-202
- King, W. (1888) Abstract report on the coal outcrops in the Sharigh Valley, Baluchistan. Records of the Geological Survey of India. 22:149-.
- King, W. (1888) Note on the discovery of trilobites by Dr H. Warth in the Neobolus beds of the Salt Range. Records of the Geological Survey of India. Records of the Geological Survey of India. Records of the Geological Survey of India. 22:153-.
- King, W. (1888) Provisional index of the local distribution of important minerals, miscellaneous minerals, gem-stones and quarry-stones in the Indian Empire. Records of the Geological Survey of India. 22:237-, 23-130-.
- King, W. (1882) Geological sketch of Vizagapatam district. Records of the Geological Survey of India, Gov. of India, Calcutta, 143-157.
- King, W. (1881) The Geology of the Pranhita-Godavari valley. Memoirs of the Geological Survey of India 18:151–311.
- King, W. (1880) The gneiss and transition rocks, and other formations of the Nellore portion of the Carnatic. Memoirs of the Geological Survey of India. 16:109-194.
- King, W. (1880) The Upper Gondwanas and other formations of the coastal region of the Godavari District. Memoirs of the Geological Survey of India. 16:195-264.
- King, W. (1872) On the Kadapah and Karnul formations in the Madras Presidency. Memoirs of the Geological Survey of India 8:1-320.
- King, W.; Foote, R.B. (1865) On the geological structure of parts of the districts of Salem, Trichinopoly, Tanjore, and South Arcot, Madras. Memoirs of the Geological Survey of India 4:223-379.
