= Griesbachites =

Griesbachites Temporal range: Carnian–Norian

Scientific classification
- Kingdom: Animalia
- Phylum: Mollusca
- Class: Cephalopoda
- Subclass: †Ammonoidea
- Order: †Ceratitida
- Family: †Haloritidae
- Genus: †Griesbachites; Mojsisovics, 1896

Genus of molluscs (fossil)

Griesbachites is a genus of Late Triassic ceratitids included in the Haloritidae, with widespread distribution from the Alps through the Himalaya and Timur to British Columbia.

The shell of Griesbachites is involute, subglobose to subdiscoidal, ribbed; with sloping sides converging on an arched venter. Like Juvavites except has nodes or clavi on the ventrolateral area of the phragmocone. Suture ammonitic.
