= Khondalite =

Foliated metamorphic rock

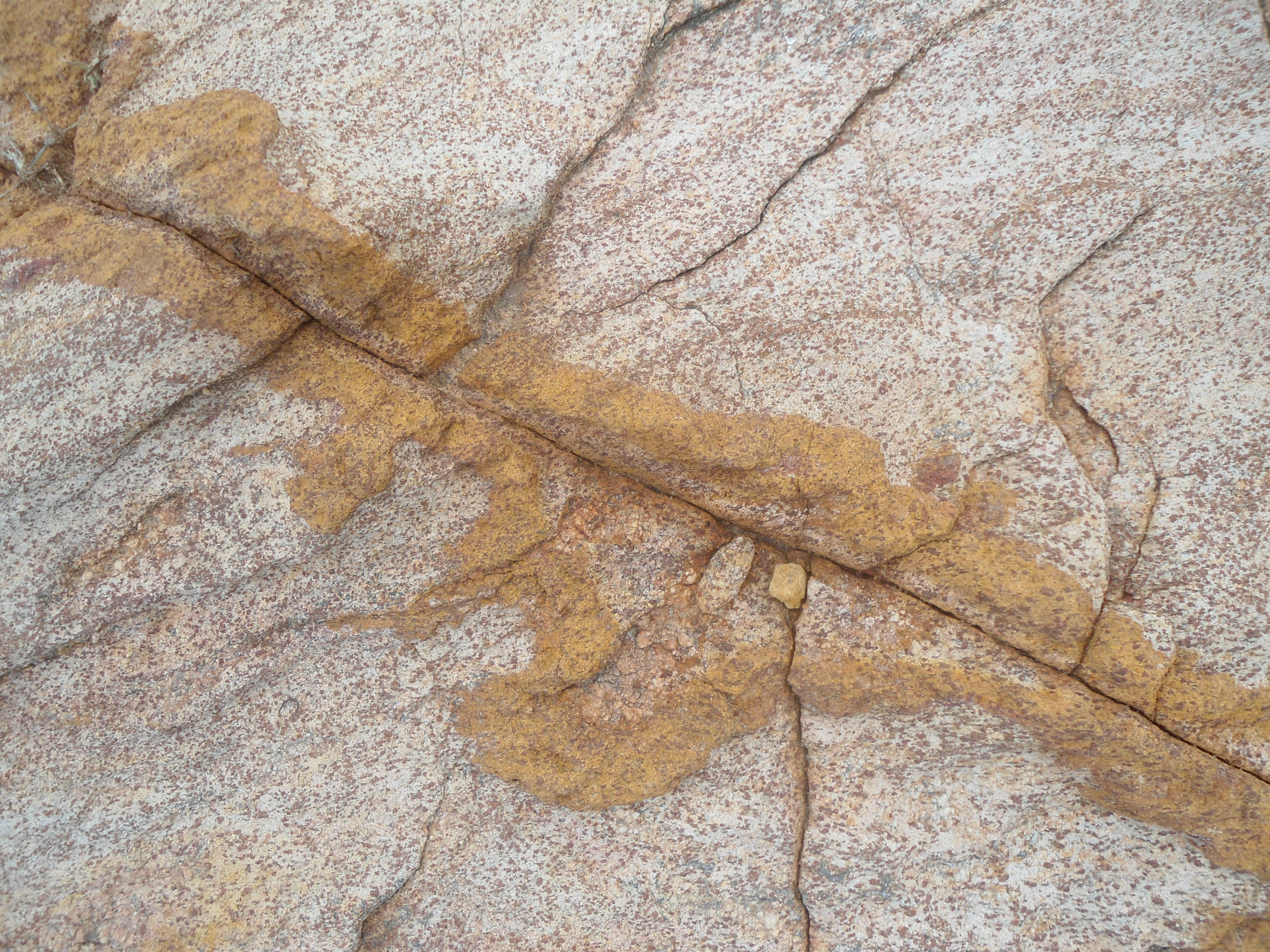
Khondalite at Rushikonda, Visakhapatnam, India

Khondalite is a foliated metamorphic rock. In India, it is also called Bezwada Gneiss and Kailasa Gneiss. It was named after the Khond tribe of Odisha and Andhra Pradesh because well-formed examples of the rock were found in the inhabited hills of these regions of eastern India.

== Distribution ==
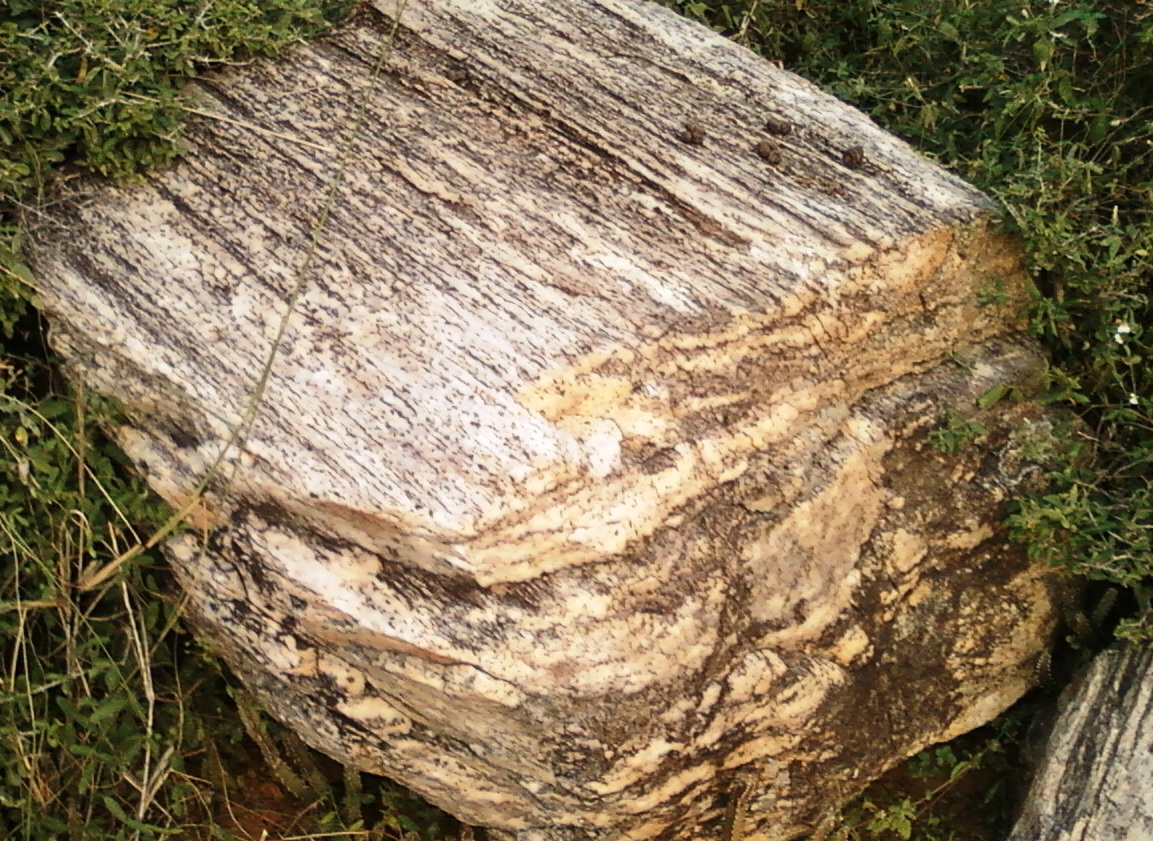
Khondalite near Anandapuram, India

Khondalite is found in the Eastern Ghats between Vijayawada and Cuttack in India. However, the term khondalite is also used to describe other rocks of similar composition found elsewhere in India as well as in Burma, Sri Lanka, the northeastern Helanshan region and the Inner Mongolia region of China.

== Composition ==
Khondalite is quartz–manganese-rich garnet–rhodonite schist. It may also contain sillimanite and graphite. Feldspar may occur in some cases.

== Formation ==
Khondalites are considered to be metasedimentary rocks formed during Archaean era. According to Lewis Leigh Fermor, the khondalite and the related charnockite of the Eastern Ghat region were formed when the Eastern Ghat belt was faulted and buried. It was uplifted later, bringing these metamorphic rocks to the surface.

== Use ==
Khondalites weather easily but still have been used in buildings and temples, for example, the Konark Sun Temple and Jagannath Temple.

== See also ==
- Gneiss
- Charnockite
