= Henry Wesley Voysey =

British geologist

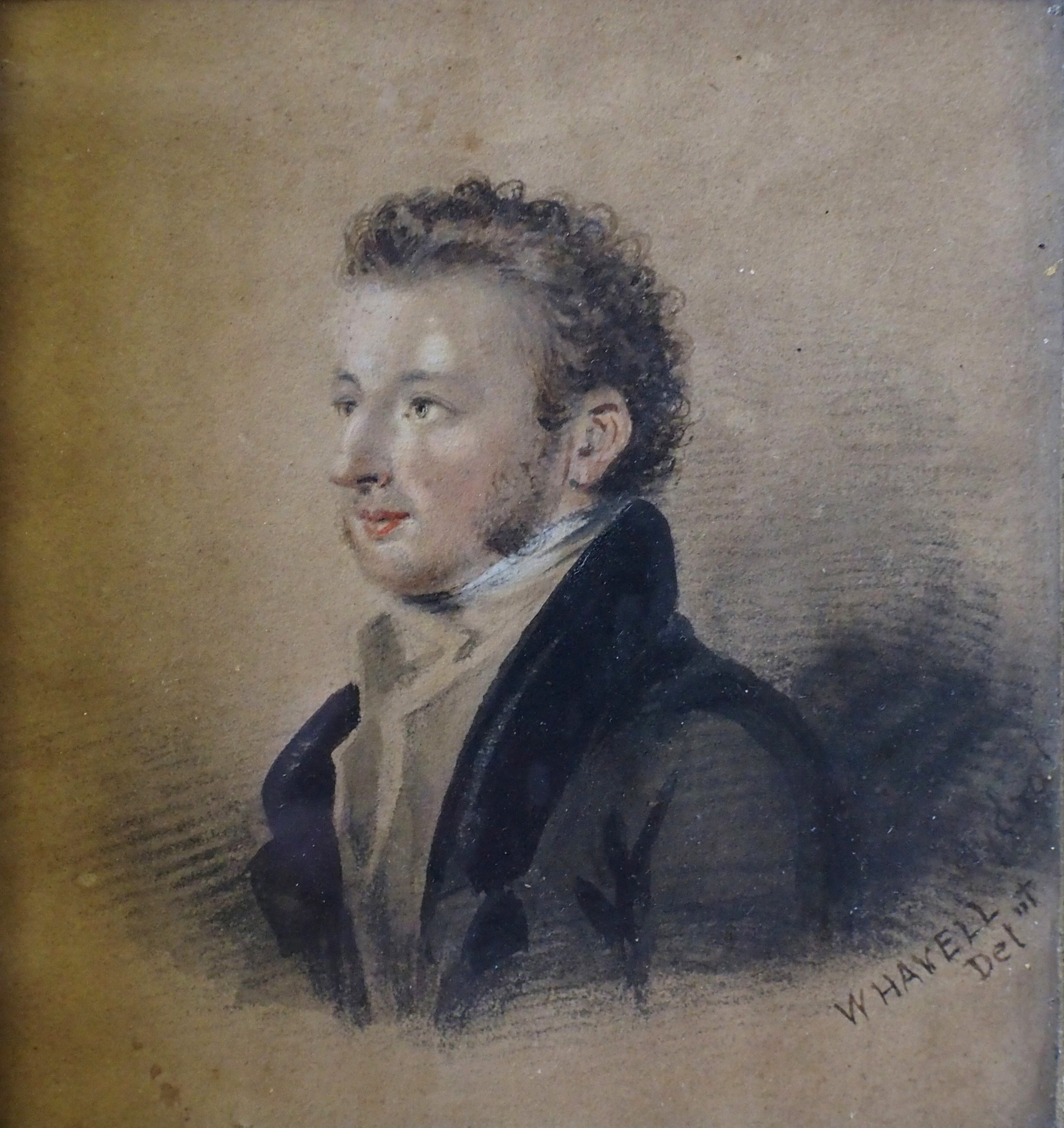
A watercolour portrait by William Havell made in Hyderabad in 1823

Henry Wesley Voysey (1791-19 April 1824), was a British physician, geologist and mineralogist who worked in India in the service of the East India Company. He has been called the "father of Indian geology." He made one of the first geological maps in India covering the Hyderabad region that he travelled through as the geologist of the Great Trigonometrical Survey of India. The map was submitted to the Asiatic Society of Bengal in Calcutta on 8 August 1821 but no copy of it remains.

== Biography ==
Voysey was the son of Baptist minister Henry Voysey (1753-?1829) and Ann Maria Annesley Ellison (d. 1836) and was born at Salisbury, Wiltshire. He was a brother of the architect Annesley Voysey (1793-1839). He is said to have studied medicine in London and Aberdeen. In his early years he was inspired to study geology by Professor Robert Jameson (1774-1854) and John MacCulloch (1773-1835), both of whom had been geologists with the Trigonometrical Surveys of Scotland. Voysey worked as a hospital assistant with the 59th Regiment of Foot from 12 May 1815 and may have taken part in the Waterloo campaign in the summer of 1815 as he makes a statement on the scenery at Oudgheer in the Deccan as being somewhat like that of the Isle de France with distinct layers visible. After the war, Voysey's battalion was disbanded and he was drafted with the 1st Battalion and made a voyage around the Cape to India where he stayed at the home of Tom Sheridan (1775-1817), son of R. B. Sheridan (1751-1816). Voysey is shown as having joined the 46th regiment of foot with effect from 29 July 1819 at Bengal but he appears to have been on half-pay and may have never joined. At Calcutta he became acquainted with Colonel William Lambton who ensured that Voysey joined the Trigonometrical Survey of India at Hyderabad, on 15 December 1818. The official geologist and surgeon-naturalist appointed in 1817 for the Trigonometrical Survey was John Ross but he did not show up. Voysey's association as surgeon with the trigonometrical survey did not allow him promotions and after the death of Lambton, he found himself financially compelled to resign. He left Ellichpur for Calcutta in January 1824 and fell sick on the 14th of April at Coliapal, west of Jehanabad. He continued on and was found dead from "jungle fever" by the bearers of his palanquin on the morning of April 19th at Sulkea ghat.

== Geology and natural history ==
Voysey examined the mineral collection of Colin Mackenzie even before he joined Lambton's survey. Voysey was attached to the trigonometrical survey and travelled with the triangulations that proceeded from Madras through the Nizam's dominion towards the Deccan Trap region. He collected mineral samples along the route and maintained notes. He did not publish them but some of the extracts from his journals were published posthumously in the Journal of the Asiatic Society of Bengal. These included notes on native steel manufacture and on Gond language. His ideas on geology were based on Werner, based on Neptunism, that rocks were formed under the oceans. He however decided that dykes or veins were produced by volcanic intrusion from below. He called laterite as "iron-clay". He observed amethystine quartz veins at Mulkapur but did not follow them into the jungle for fear of tigers. He used Secunderabad as a base and worked with George Everest during this part of the survey. In 1819 he and Everest returned to the region and during free time in the rainy season would indulge in rolling granite boulders down the hills. The trip however resulted in both suffering from malaria. Voysey's knowledge of French allowed him to interact with Alfred Duvaucel when he was in Calcutta. He was also in touch with French research and when Everest wanted to measure humidity, it was Voysey who suggested the wet and dry bulb thermometer approach invented by the French.

In 1823 Voysey wrote in a letter that he was preparing a sketch of the geology of India based on his travels and observations made since 1819: "It may appear rather presumptuous in me to attempt a sketch of Indian geology after so short a residence, particularly when you recollect that Smith's map of English geology took him twenty years to complete. There is, however, this remarkable difference between the two countries, that in India, instead of twenty different formations, as in England, there are only four..." The geological map that Voysey finally submitted to the Asiatic Society of Bengal in Calcutta on 8 August 1821 was lost and attempts were made to obtain a copy but has been untraced.

In a letter to William Lambton, Voysey also pointed out the role of geology in surveying and was a forerunner to the work of Pratt: "In addition to the great advantage to Science and to the Arts from a knowledge of the Geological structure of the country obtained from Section maps and collections of Specimens, I conceive that a very important object of a Geological enquiry lies in determining the cause of these anomalies which sometimes occur in Trigonometrical operations and which can only be explained by supposing them to arise from concealing disturbing forces owing to difference in the specific gravity of the upper, lower or contiguous strata."

Voysey was also an observer of economic botany and was aware of the work of contemporaries like Benjamin Heyne. He noted during his travels, the crops cultivated and their soil associations. He recognized that the black soils of the Deccan were derived from the basaltic rocks of the region. He noted in the Hyderabad region that plants like Ottelia alismoides and Nelumbo nucifera were common in unused irrigation ponds. He also recorded the cultivation of safflower, castor apart from the use of palmyra palms and teak.

Clements Markham, in his history of the Indian surveys, claimed that Voysey was the first officially posted geologist to work in India. This claim is incorrect as there was at least one other official posting, that of Alexander Laidlaw (d. 1836) who was posted as mineralogist and geologist in June 1817 under Captain Webb as part of a geodetic survey in Kumaon. Laidlaw however was dismissed from work and he produced no publication or report on his work. After Voysey's death, there was no immediate appointment of a naturalist-geologist as part of the Trigonometrical Survey and this was seen by some as a great loss.
