= Henry Benedict Medlicott =

Irish geologist (1829–1905)

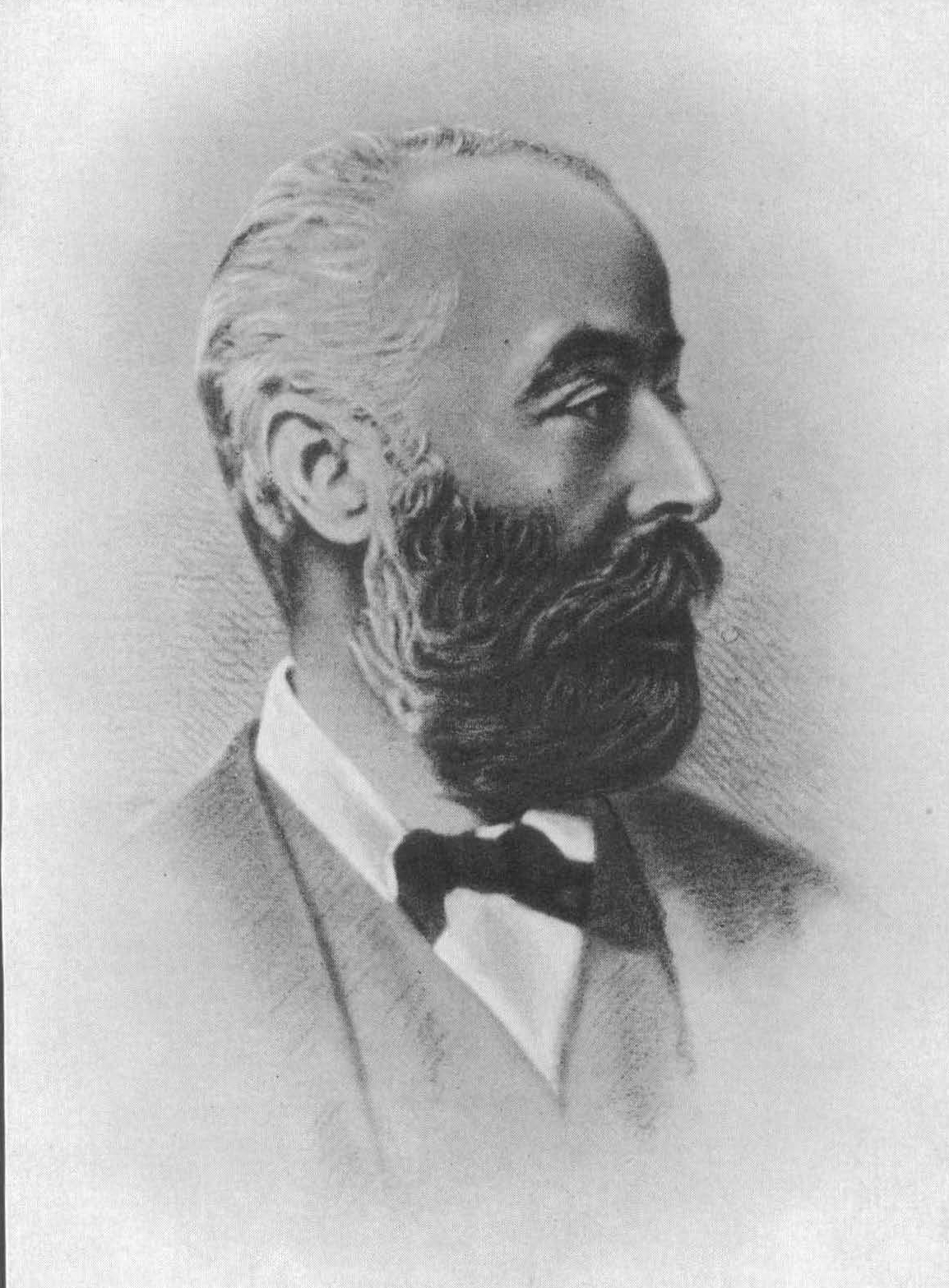
- Born: 3 August 1829
- Died: 6 April 1905
- Known for: Gondwanaland

Henry Benedict Medlicott, FRS (3 August 1829 – 6 April 1905) was an Irish geologist who worked in India. He was a coauthor of a text on the geology of India and is credited with the coining of the term "Gondwana" which was later used to create the concept of Gondwanaland.

== Early life ==
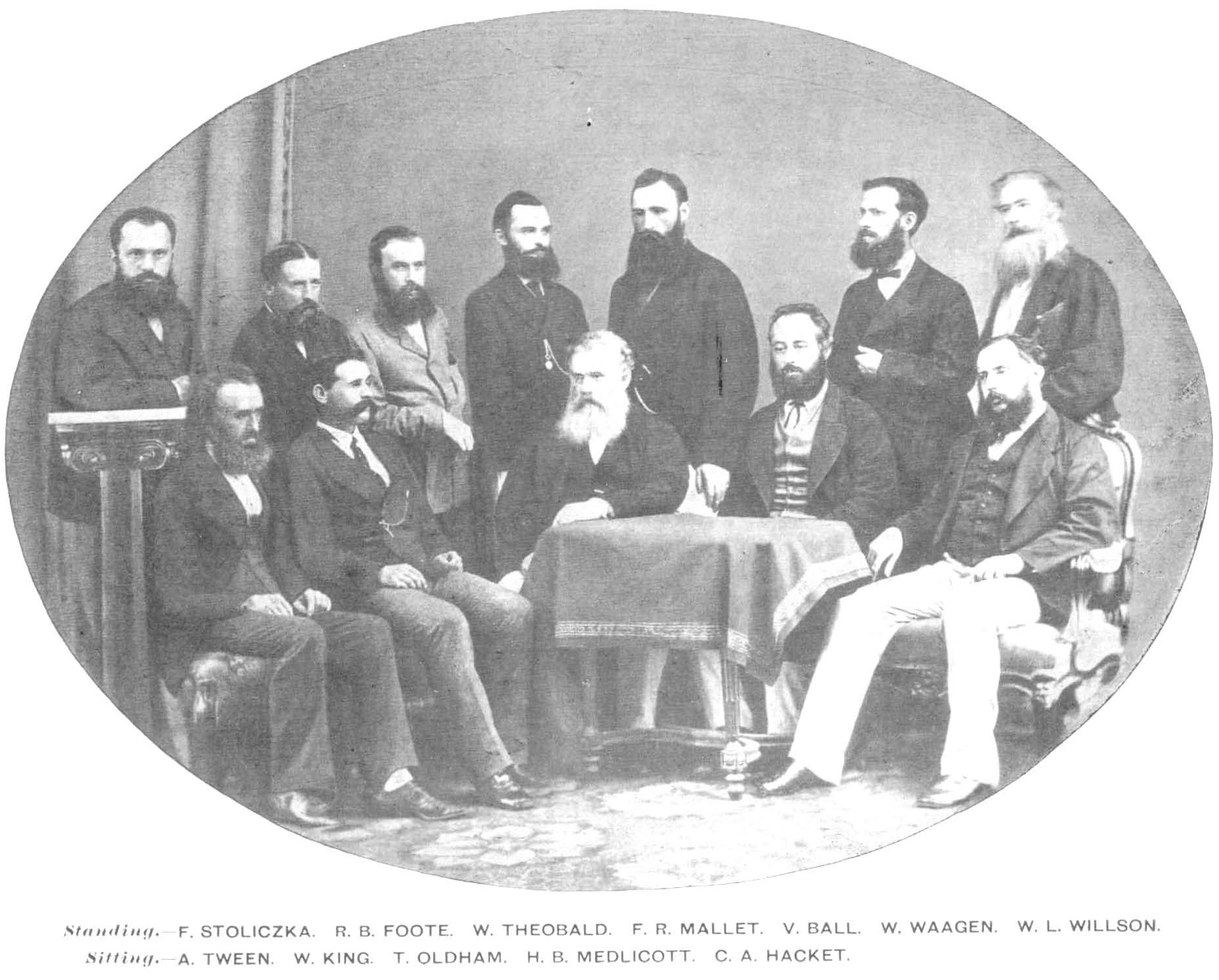
Members of the Geological Survey of India, 1870: F. Stoliczka, R. B. Foote, W. Theobald, F. R. Mallet, V. Ball, W. Waagen, W. L. Willson (standing); A. Tween, W. King, T. Oldham, H. B. Medlicott, C. A. Hackett (sitting)

He was born in Loughrea, County Galway, Ireland, the son of the Church of Ireland Rector of Loughrea, Samuel Medlicott (1796–1858) and his wife Charlotte (c.1814-1884), daughter of Henry Benedict Dolphin, C. B. He was educated at Trinity College, Dublin under Thomas Oldham (1816–1875) as well as in France, Guernsey, and Dublin. He obtained a BA in 1850 with diploma in honours in the School of Civil Engineering and an MA in 1870.

He was an expert in French and was acquainted with the works of the French geologists. He joined the Geological Survey of Ireland as a general assistant in October 1851 working under Joseph Jukes(1811–1869) and later with the British Geological Survey in Wiltshire before resigning to join the Geological Survey of India in March 1854. On the recommendation of Sir Henry De la Beche (1796–1855), he was given the post of geology professor at Thomason College of Civil Engineering at Roorkee. His brothers Joseph G. Medlicott (d. 1866) and Samuel (c.1831–1889) worked in the Geological Survey of Ireland while Joseph later worked in India.

== Career in India ==
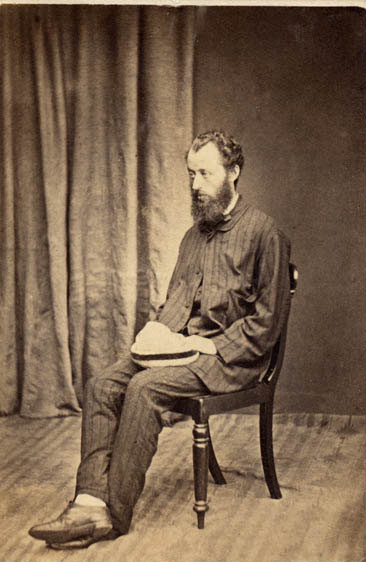

From 15 August 1854 he worked at Roorkee, making trips with Thomas Oldham. He married Louisa, daughter of Reverend Daniel Henry Maunsell, at Landour near Mussoorie on 27 October 1857. In 1857 he served as a volunteer with the garrison of Roorkee against the mutineers and was awarded the Indian Mutiny Medal for Special Service. While at Roorkee, he studied parts of the Narmada Valley and Bundelkhand (in 1854–55 and 1856–57). He worked on the geology of the Lower Himalayas and the Siwalik Beds.

Along with his brother Joseph G. Medlicott, he was able to determine the separation of the Cambrian Vindhyan region from the Gondwana. He later worked in various parts of the country such as South Rewa, Bihar, Assam, Khasi Hills, Rajputana, Kashmir, the Satpura ranges and the Garo Hills. On 1 April 1876 he succeeded Dr Oldham to head the Department of Geology and was posted in Calcutta. The position was changed from Superintendent to Director in 1885. Medlicott began to isolate himself from social life and began to live an ascetic life, walking barefoot and editing papers. He wrote Manual of the Geology of India with William Thomas Blanford in 1879 and edited works in the Paleontologica Indica. His writing style was considered intemperate by his contemporaries but he began a policy to allow his subordinates free expression in print, a move that caused resentment among the staff. He was hostile to the promotion of native Indian geologists.

He was elected a Fellow of the Royal Society in 1877 and won the Wollaston Medal of the Geological Society in 1888. He was a Fellow of Calcutta University, and from 1879 to 1881 he was President of the Asiatic Society of Bengal.

== Later days ==
He retired in April 1887 and lived at Clifton Bristol where he continued to research his interests in philosophy and theology. He died on 6 April 1905, leaving behind his wife, two sons and two daughters. His obituarist and colleague Blanford (who died in the same year) noted that he never used "FRS" after his name in any publications.

== Legacy ==
He is credited with having suggested the name Gondwana. He used the term to describe stratigraphy of a mostly Permian formation in India. The geologist Eduard Suess noted the widespread Glossopteris fossil flora and called all the regions "Gondwana-Land" and included India, Madagascar and Africa but not Australia.
