= Lewis Leigh Fermor =

British chemist and geologist

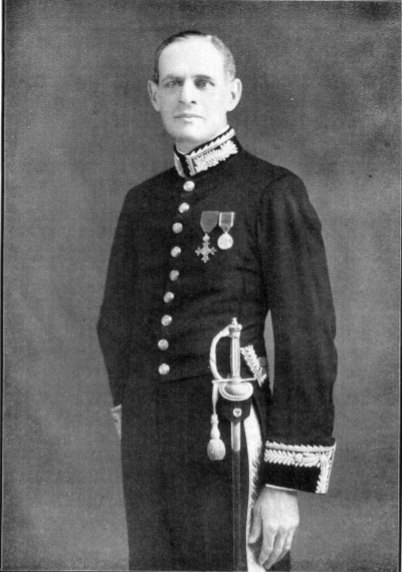
- Born: 18 September 1880; Peckham, London, England
- Died: 24 May 1954 (aged 73); Horsell, Surrey, England
- Children: Patrick Leigh Fermor
- Awards: OBE; Bigsby Medal (1921); FRS
- Scientific career
- Fields: Geology

Sir Lewis Leigh Fermor, OBE, FRS (18 September 1880 – 24 May 1954), was a British chemist and geologist and the first president of the Indian National Science Academy and a director of the Geological Survey of India (1930-1935). His son was the writer and traveller Sir Patrick Leigh Fermor.

== Early life ==
Fermor was born in Peckham in south London, the eldest of six children born to Lewis Fermor and Maria (née James); his middle name was given in honour of his father's best friend. His father was a clerk at the London Joint Stock Bank (acquired by the Midland Bank in 1917); his early retirement through ill health put the family in financial difficulties, and a subsequent attempt at setting up a sign-writing business met with little success. Lewis Leigh Fermor was educated at Wilson's Grammar School in Camberwell and studied metallurgy at the Royal School of Mines, with scholarships at each, and winning the Murchison medal for geology at the latter, where he took a BSc in 1907 and DSc in 1909. He was too old to accept an exhibition that he won at London University.

== Career ==
Fermor was initially interested in continuing a career in metallurgy but was persuaded to apply to the Geological Survey of India by his professor, John Wesley Judd. The interview was by W. T. Blanford, then retired, and he was selected despite his expertise in chemistry rather than geology. Blanford may have seen the value of his expertise for the study of crystalline archaean rocks and Fermor would indeed later work extensively on petrology. He arrived in India in 1902, having accepted a position as assistant superintendent in the Geological Survey of India. He was one of the founders of geology in India. His major interest was in Archaean geology, and in igneous and metamorphic rocks. He was curator of the geology collection at the Indian Museum from 1905 to 1907. He did important work on deposits of manganese and coal, and he was awarded a Doctorate of Science by London University in 1909. He first described the mineral Hollandite in 1906 and the mineral Fermorite, discovered in 1910, is named after him. He became a superintendent in the Geological Survey of India in 1910, and was awarded an OBE for his work for the Indian Railway Board and then the Indian Munitions Board during the First World War.

In 1921 he was awarded the Bigsby Medal of the Geological Society of London for a paper published in 1913 on the use of garnet as a geological barometer, as a marker of the pressures to which rocks had been subjected. He was a founder member of the Mining and Geological Institute of India, and its president in 1922. After several periods as acting director, he was director of the Geological Survey of India from 1932 to 1935. He was a Trustee of the Indian Museum from 1930 to 1935, president of the 20th session of the Indian Science Congress in 1933, became a Fellow of the Royal Society in 1934, and he was knighted by the Government of India in 1935. He was president of the Asiatic Society of Bengal from 1933 to 1936, and the first elected president of the National Institute of Sciences of India in 1935. After retiring as director of the Geological Survey of India in 1935, he continued to live and work mainly in India until 1939, also visiting Kenya and South Africa. He continued to contribute to learned societies, and also worked as a geological consultant for private businesses. He was president of the Bristol Naturalists' Society in 1945, and vice-president of the Geological Society of London from 1945 to 1947.

== Private life ==
Fermor married Muriel Eileen (or Aeyleen) Ambler, ten years his junior, in 1909. Her grandfather was Warrant Officer (William) James Ambler on HMS Bellerophon when Napoléon I surrendered to it. Their son, Patrick Leigh Fermor (1915–2011), was raised and educated in England and did not visit his father in India; he later became well known for his travel writing.

Fermor separated from his first wife, and married Frances Mary Case in 1933.

He died in Horsell near Woking in Surrey, survived by his second wife, and his son and daughter from his first marriage.
