= Fossil parks in India =

The Geological Survey of India (GSI) currently maintains two protected areas bearing rich fossil deposits.

- Shivalik Fossil Park, near Saketi, Himachal Pradesh is notable for its life-size models of the vertebrates that might have roamed the Sivalik Hills 1.5—2.5 million years ago.
- Mandla Plant Fossils National Park, near Dindori, Madhya Pradesh is a park that attempts to preserve the fossil remains of a primordial forest that covered the region 40—150 million years ago.

Both parks, numerous fossil displays and models in Indian zoological parks, are part of the Geological Survey's charter program to educate the general public on the Earth's evolutionary history. One of the more comprehensive displays is that of the Natural History Museum of the Nehru Zoological Park, Hyderabad.

The GSI also manages the following fossil parks:

- National Fossil Wood Park, Tiruvakkarai in Tamil Nadu.
- National Fossil Wood Park, Sathanur, in Tamil Nadu

Other fossil parks in India include:

- Dinosaur Fossils National Park, Dhar, Madhya Pradesh
- Indroda Dinosaur and Fossil Park, Gujarat
- Ghughua Fossil Park, Madhya Pradesh
- Salkhan Fossils Park, Uttar Pradesh
- Akal Wood Fossil Park, Rajasthan
- Amkhoi Fossil Park, West Bengal
- Rajmahal Hills Fossil Park, Bihar
- Wadadham Fossils Park, Wadadam, Sironcha, Gadchiroli, Maharashtra

== See also ==
- List of fossil sites (with link directory)
- Archaeological sites in India
- Tourism in India
