= List of fossil parks =

Following is a list of protected areas where fossils are preserved, known as fossil parks or fossil reserves, worldwide by country.

== Africa ==
=== Egypt ===
Wadi Al-Hitan - Valley of The Whales, Fayyoum, Western Desert

=== South Africa ===
West Coast Fossil Park, Langebaanweg, Western Cape

== Asia ==
=== India ===
There are two geological parks maintained by the Geological Survey of India:

- Dinosaur Fossils National Park, Dhar, Madhya Pradesh
- Shivalik Fossil Park, Saketi, H.P.
- Salkhan Fossils Park, Sonbhadra, U.P.
- Mandla Plant Fossils National Park
- Indroda Dinosaur and Fossil Park, Gandhinagar, Gujarat
- National Fossil Wood Park, Tiruvakkarai
- National Fossil Wood Park, Sathanur
- Akal Wood Fossil Park, Jaisalmer, Rajasthan
- Amkhoi Fossil Park, West Bengal.

=== Japan ===
- Sendai City Tomizawa Site Museum houses a fossilized forest and human artifacts

== Australia ==
=== Australia ===
==== Victoria ====
- Dinosaur Dreaming
- Dinosaur Cove

==== Queensland ====
- Riversleigh

==== South Australia ====
- Lake Callabonna Fossil Reserve
- Lake Ngapakaldi to Lake Palankarinna Fossil Area
- Maslin Bay - Aldinga Bay Geological Site
- Naracoorte Caves National Park
- Nilpena Ediacara National Park
- Willalinchina Sandstone Fossil Flora site, near Woomera

== North America ==
=== Canada ===
- Ancient Echoes Interpretive Centre, Saskatchewan
- Dinosaur Provincial Park, Alberta
- Driftwood Canyon Provincial Park, British Columbia
- Yoho National Park (Burgess Shale) UNESCO site, British Columbia
- Joggins Fossil Cliffs UNESCO site, Nova Scotia
- McAbee Fossil Beds Heritage Site
- Parc national de Miguasha UNESCO site, Quebec

=== United States ===
==== Arizona ====
Petrified Forest National Park

==== California ====
- La Brea Tar Pits
- Petrified Forest, Calistoga CA

==== Colorado ====
- Dinosaur National Monument, in Northwest Colorado and North-East Utah.
- Dinosaur Ridge
- Florissant Fossil Beds National Monument

==== Connecticut ====
Dinosaur State Park and Arboretum

==== Florida ====
Windley Key Fossil Reef Geological State Park

==== Idaho ====
Hagerman Fossil Beds National Monument

==== Indiana ====
Falls of the Ohio State Park

==== Iowa ====
- Fossil and Prairie Park

Fossilized leaves are one of many found here.

- Devonian Fossil Gorge at Coralville Lake

==== Maryland ====
Dinosaur Park

==== Massachusetts ====
Dinosaur Footprints

==== Michigan ====
Rockport Quarry, an abandoned limestone quarry near Alpena open to collecting

==== Mississippi ====
Mississippi Petrified Forest

==== Nebraska ====
- Agate Fossil Beds National Monument
- Ashfall State Historical Park

==== Nevada ====
- Tule Springs Fossil Beds National Monument

==== New Jersey ====
Poricy Park

==== New Mexico ====
- Clayton Lake State Park
- Prehistoric Trackways National Monument

New York

Penn Dixie Fossil Park & Nature Reserve

==== Ohio ====
- Hueston Woods State Park
- Trammel Fossil Park, Sharonville, Ohio

==== Oregon ====
John Day Fossil Beds National Monument

==== South Dakota ====
- The Mammoth Site
- Fossil Cycad National Monument (No longer exists)

==== Texas ====
- Dinosaur Valley State Park
- Ladonia Fossil Park, Ladonia, Texas
- Mineral Wells Fossil Park, Mineral Wells, Texas

==== Utah ====
- Dinosaur National Monument
- Escalante Petrified Forest State Park
- Prehistoric Trackways National Monument

==== Wyoming ====
- Fossil Butte National Monument
- Red Gulch Dinosaur Tracksite
- Yellowstone National Park

== South America and Central America ==
=== Argentina ===
Ischigualasto is located in San Juan province

=== Bolivia ===
Cal Orcko in Sucre

=== Brazil ===
Paleorrota Geopark is located in Rio Grande do Sul.

== See also ==
- Paleontology
- Prehistoric life
- Timeline of geography, paleontology, biology
- Synchrotron X-ray tomographic microscopy
- Fossil Parks of India
- List of fossil sites
