= Sathanur =

Sathanur may refer to several places in India:

== Andhra Pradesh ==
- Sathanur, Andhra Pradesh, a village in Kosigi Taluk, Kurnool district

== Karnataka ==
- Sathanur, Kanakapura, Karnataka, Ramanagara district
  - Sathanur (Vidhan Sabha constituency), Legislative Assembly constituency of Karnataka, India
- Sathanur, Magadi, Karnataka, a village in Ramanagara district
- Sathanur, Bengaluru, Karnataka, a village
- Sathanur, Mandya, Karnataka, Mandya district
- Sathanurapalli, a village in Srinivaspur Taluk, Kolar district

== Tamil Nadu ==
- Sathanur, Perambalur, Tamil Nadu, a village in Kunnam Taluk, Perambalur district
  - National Fossil Wood Park, Sathanur, Perambalur, Tamil Nadu
- Sathanur, Thandrampet, Tamil Nadu, a village in Thandrampet Taluk, Tiruvannamalai district
  - Sathanur Dam, Tamil Nadu, India
- Sathanoor, Vandavasi, Tamil Nadu, a village in Vandavasi Taluk, Tiruvannamalai district
- Sathanur, Tirukkoyilur, Tamil Nadu, a village in Tirukkoyilur Taluk, Viluppuram district
- Sathanur, Kallakkurichi, Tamil Nadu, a village in Kallakkurichi Taluk, Viluppuram district
- Sathanur, Thiruvarur, Tamil Nadu, a village in Needamangalam Taluk, Thiruvarur district
- Sathanur, Thiruvidaimarudur Central, Tamil Nadu, a village in Thiruvidaimarudur Taluk, Thanjavur district (2011 Census Village code: 638442)
- Sathanur, Thiruvidaimarudur South, Tamil Nadu, a village in Thiruvidaimarudur Taluk, Thanjavur district (2011 Census Village code: 638467)
- Sathanur, Needamangalam, Tamil Nadu, a village in Needamangalam Taluk, Thanjavur district
- Sathanur, Thiruvaiyaru, Tamil Nadu, a village in Thiruvaiyaru Taluk, Thanjavur district
- Sathanur, Sivaganga, Tamil Nadu, a village in Ponnamaravathi Taluk, Sivaganga district
- Sathanur, Ramanathapuram, Tamil Nadu, a village in Mudukulathur Taluk, Ramanathapuram district
- Sathanur, Krishnagiri, Tamil Nadu, a village in Denkanikottai Taluk, Krishnagiri district
- Sathanur, Tindivanam, Tamil Nadu, a village in Tindivanam Taluk, Olakkur Union, Villupuram District

== See also ==
- Sattanur (disambiguation)
