= Chandramouleeswar Temple, Thiruvakkarai =

Chandramowleeswarar Temple
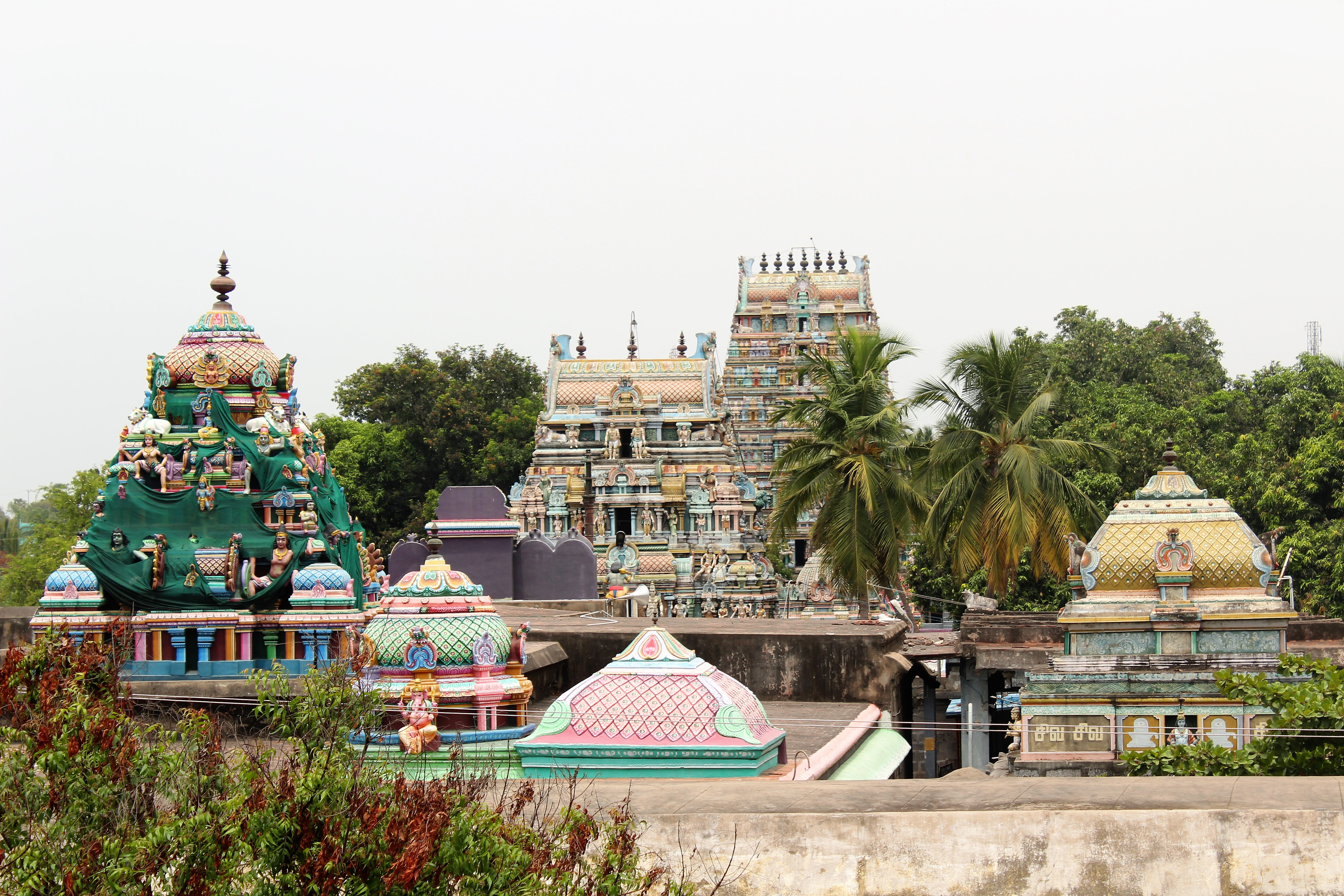

- Location in Tamil Nadu

Religion
- Affiliation: Hinduism
- District: Villupuram
- Deity: Chandramowleeswarar(Shiva) Amirthambigai(Parvathi)

Location
- Location: Thiruvakkarai
- State: Tamil Nadu
- Country: India
- Coordinates: 12°01′40″N 79°39′08″E

Architecture
- Type: Tamil architecture

Chandramowleeswarar Temple, Thiruvakkarai (also called Piraisoodiya Emperuman or Vakrakali temple) in Thiruvakkarai, a village in Villupuram district in the South Indian state of Tamil Nadu, is dedicated to the Hindu god Shiva. Constructed in the Tamilian style of architecture, the temple is believed to have been built during the Cholas period in the 10th century. The temple has received gracious endowments from the Chola queen Sembiyan Mahadevi. Shiva is worshipped as Chandramowleeswarar and his consort Parvathi as Amirthambigai.

The presiding deity is revered in the 7th-century-CE Tamil Saiva canonical work, the Tevaram, written by Tamil saint poets known as the Nayanmars and classified as Paadal Petra Sthalam. A granite wall surrounds the temple, enclosing all its shrines. The temple has a seven-tiered Rajagopuram, the gateway tower.

The temple is open from 6 am - 1 pm and 4 pm -8:30 pm on all days except during new moon days when it is open the full day. Four daily rituals and three yearly festivals are held at the temple, of which the Chitrapournami festival celebrated during the Tamil month of Panguni (April - May), the float festival for Chandramowleeswarar during the Tamil month of Vaikasi, and the Kanum Pongal festival during the Tamil month of Thai are the most prominent. The temple is maintained and administered by the Hindu Religious and Endowment Board of the Government of Tamil Nadu.

It is located close to the Auroville and National Fossil Wood Park also in Thiruvakkarai.

== Legend ==
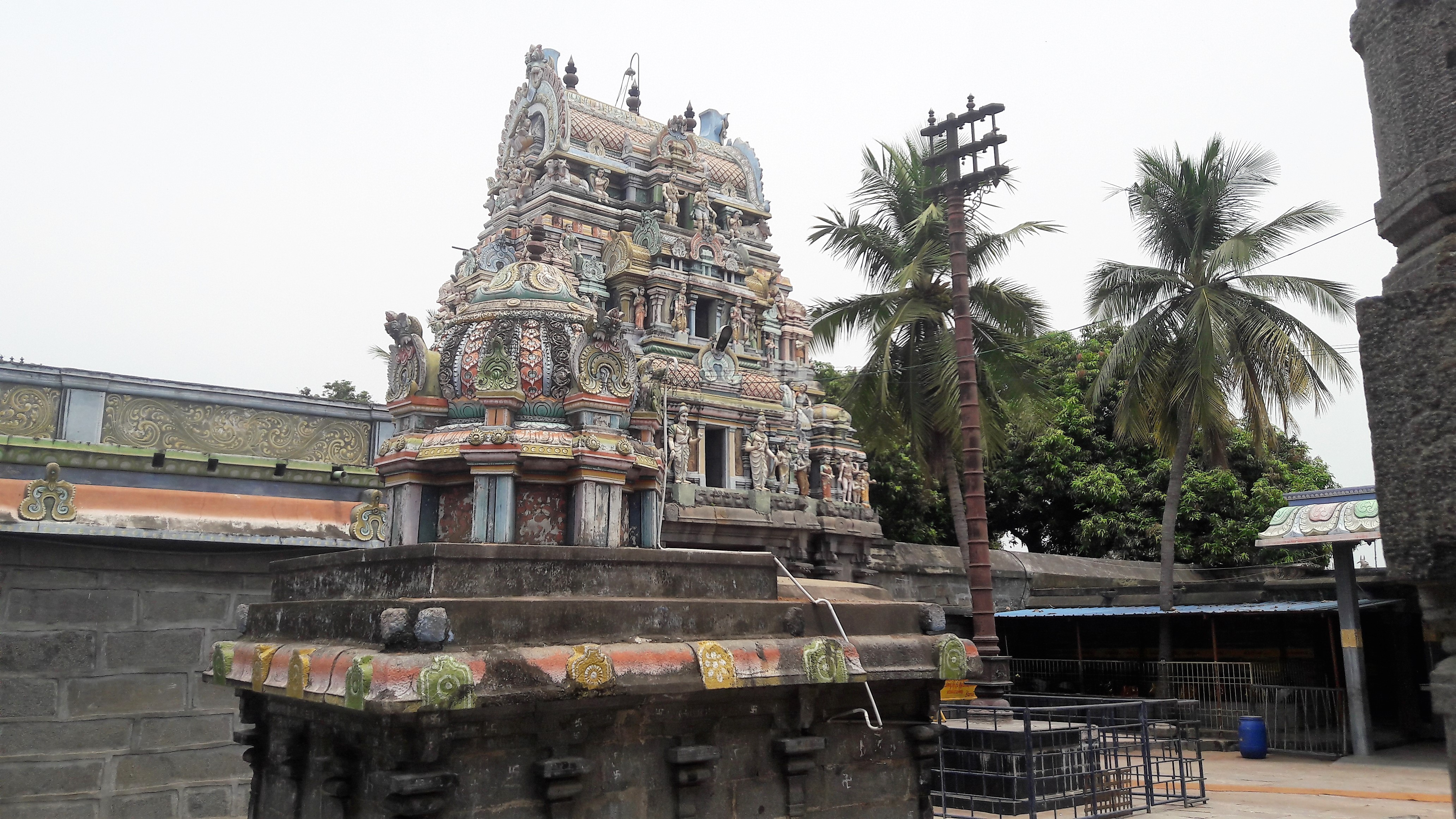

As per Hindu legend, Vishnu killed a demon king Vakrasura. Kali destroyed Vakrasura's sister Dhunmuki. Since Dhummuki was pregnant, she pulled out the child from the womb and wore it as an ear ring in her right ear. Since Kali slayed the sister of Vakrasura, she came to be known as Vakrakali and the place came to be known as Thiruvakkarai. It is believed that Adi Shankara quelled her anger by installing a Srichakra in her left leg. The place is called Vakra Shanti Tiruthalam. The shrine of Kali is modelled similar to the Durga shrine at Thenupuriswarar Temple at Patteeswaram, Brahma Chamundeeswari Chidambaram and Thillai Kali at Chidambaram. Usually Kali temples are located in the outskirts of the village, but the shrine of Kali is located inside a Shiva temple only at Thiruvakkarai.

== History ==
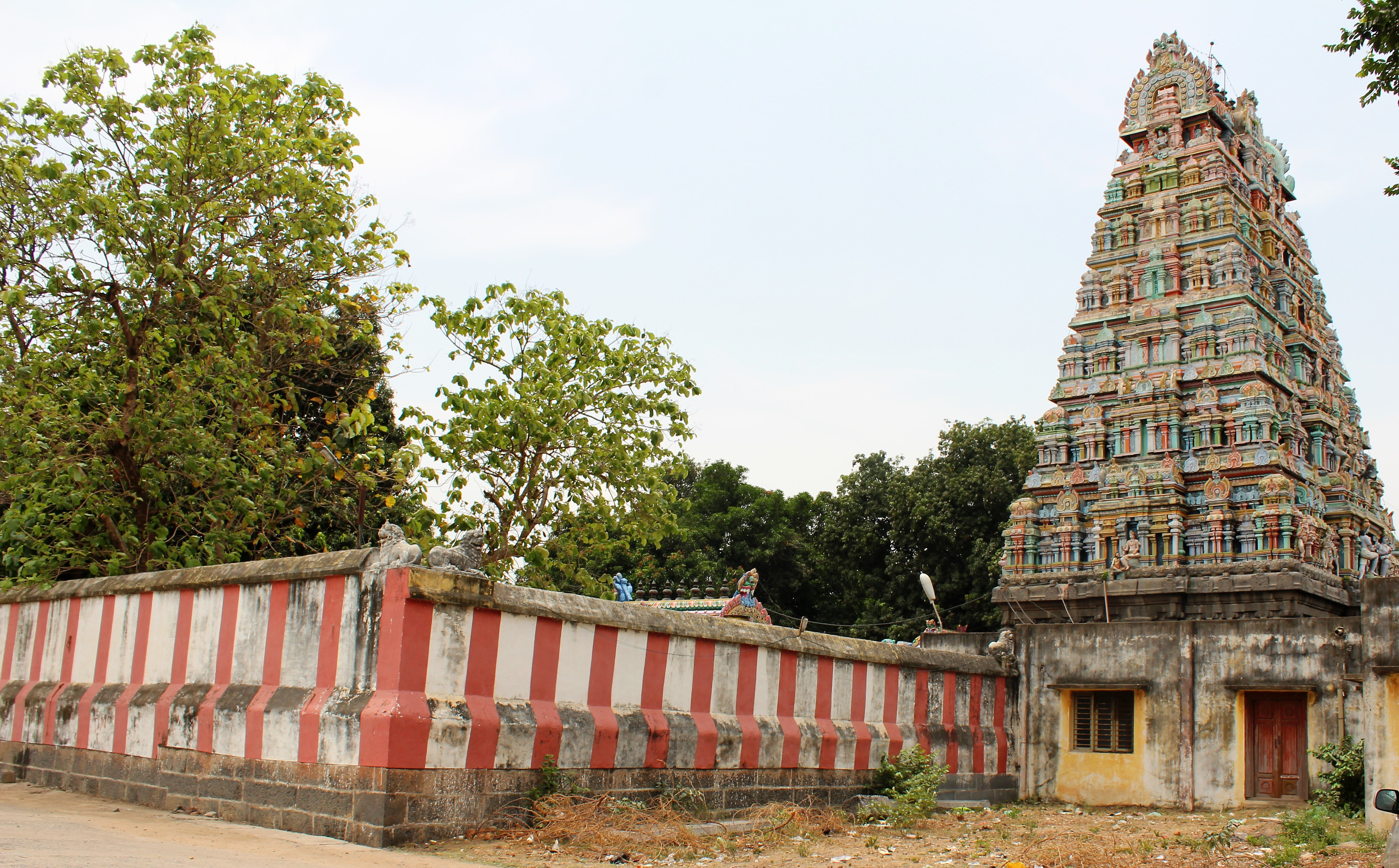

The exact year of building could not be ascertained from the inscriptions, but the stone structure of Chandramowleeswarar shrine in its current form, is built during the time of Chola king Aditya I (870–907 CE). The inscriptions on the two sides of the Southern shrine of the temple indicate an endowment from Aditya for perpetual lighting of lamps in the temple. Theerthavari, the sacred bathing of the presiding deity during the auspicious days in the Tamil month of Puratasi (September - October). The temple has another inscription in the second precinct during the time of Uttama Chola (970-985 CE) for the maintenance and worship of Chandramowleeswarar and Varadaraja Perumal afforded to four able men. During the reign of Raja Raja Chola I (984-1015 CE), a village named Manali was gifted to the temple - the inscription indicates that the temple was built by Sembiyar Mahadevi. The structure of the Vishnu shrine is believed to have expanded during the reign of Rajendra Chola I (1012-1044). A bilingual inscription in the Vishnu temple indicates that the Kota Chola Vimanan built by Kota Chola was rebuilt during the reign of Athirajendra (1070-70). There are references to indicate that the Vakra Kali temple is existing from Pallava times. In modern times, the temple is administered by the Hindu Religious and Charitable Endowments Department of the Government of Tamil Nadu.

== Architecture ==
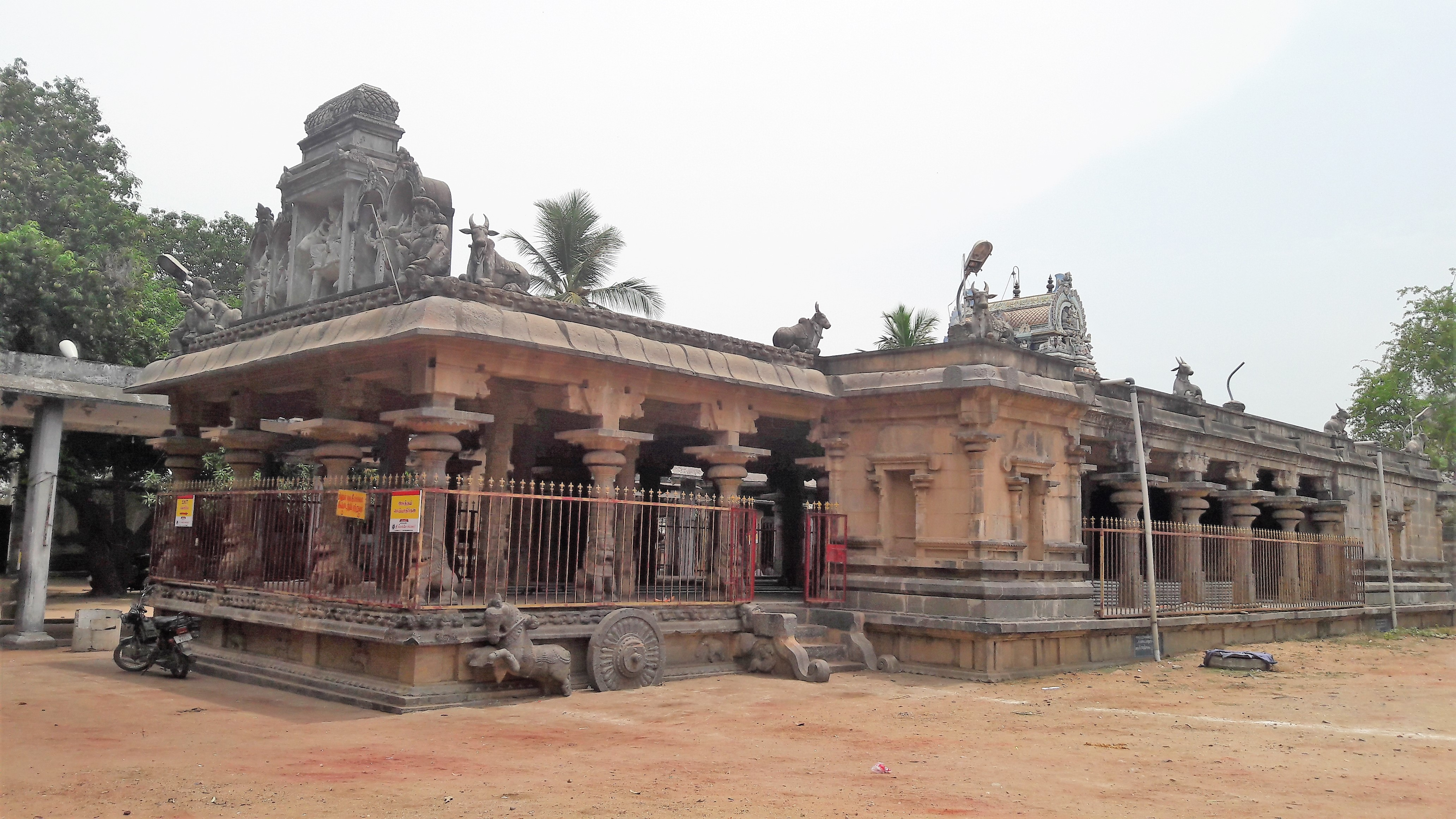
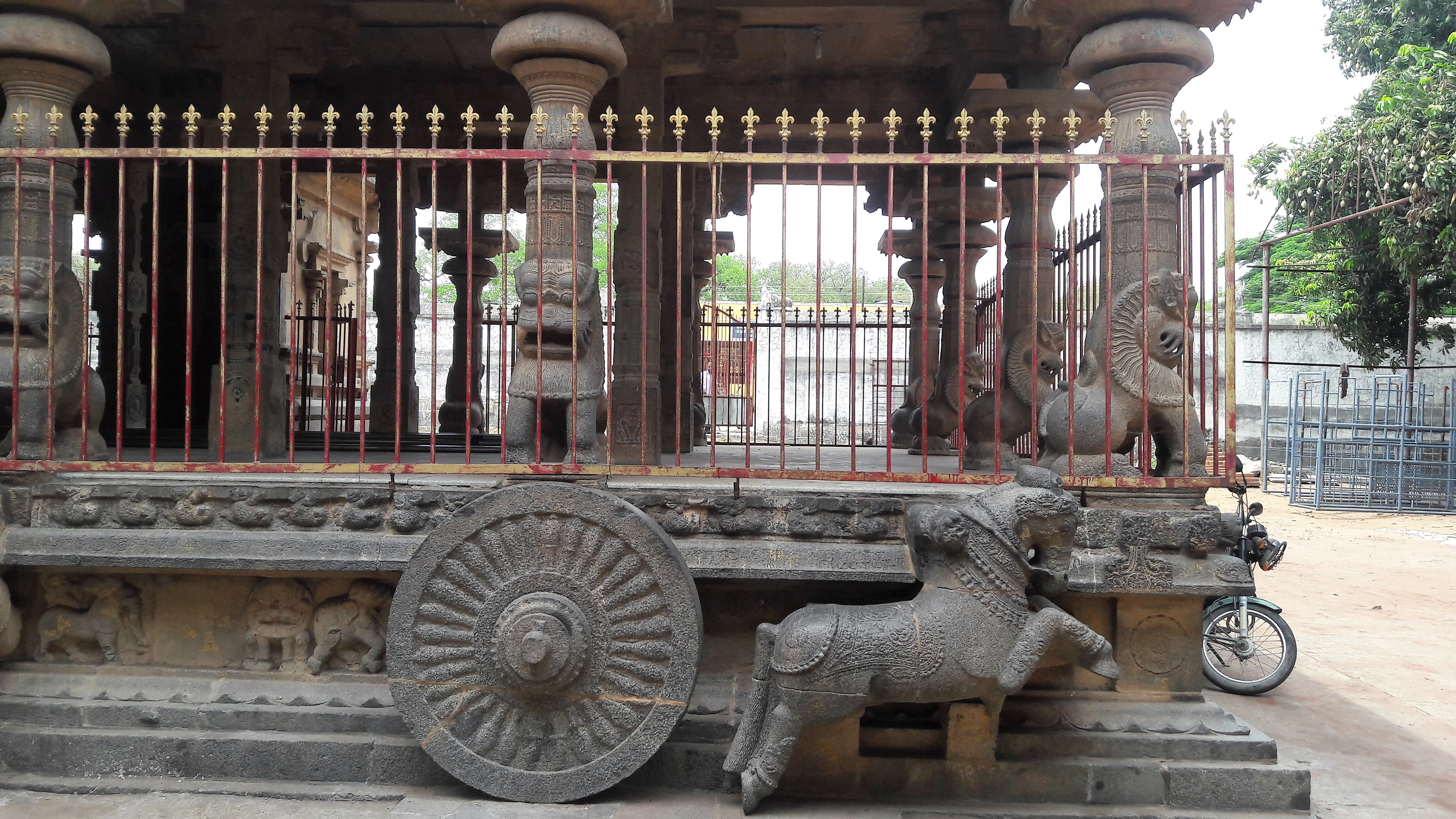
Shrines of the temple

Chandramowleeswarar temple is located in Thiruvakkarai, a village located on the banks of Varaha river, located 20 km (12 mi) from Villupuram. The temple in its current structure built of stone was built by the Chola king Aditya I (870–907 CE). The temple has a seven-tiered Rajagopuram, the gateway tower that pierces the rectangular wall that houses all the shrines. The temple tank is located adjacent to the temple. The sanctum sanctorum houses one of the rare images of Chandramowleeswarar in the form of Lingam, an iconic form of Shiva with three faces, said to be of the very few in India. There is an Ardha Mandapa and a Mukha mandapa, pillared halls leading to the sanctum. The first precinct has the shrines of Vinayakar, Murugan, Durga, Dakshinamurthy and Chandikeswara. The second precinct has a hundred pillared hall.

Architecturally there are many things in this temple that are contrary to tradition. Generally, one can have the darshan of the main deity from the entrance itself, however, in this temple the main deity is not visible as the Moolavar is not in a straight line. In fact, none of main features of the temple—the Rajagopuram, flag post, Nandhi—are on a straight line and are found slightly away from one another. Also, unlike other temples the Sani Bhagavan’s Vahanam, the crow is facing the left side as opposed to the normal right side. All these are attributed to the vakram nature (contradictory) of the temple.

There is a separate shrine for Varadaraja Perumal Lord Vishnu and the idol has the unique feature of Prayoka Chakra, this cannot be seen elsewhere and the shrine for vakra Kali in the second precinct.

== Festival ==
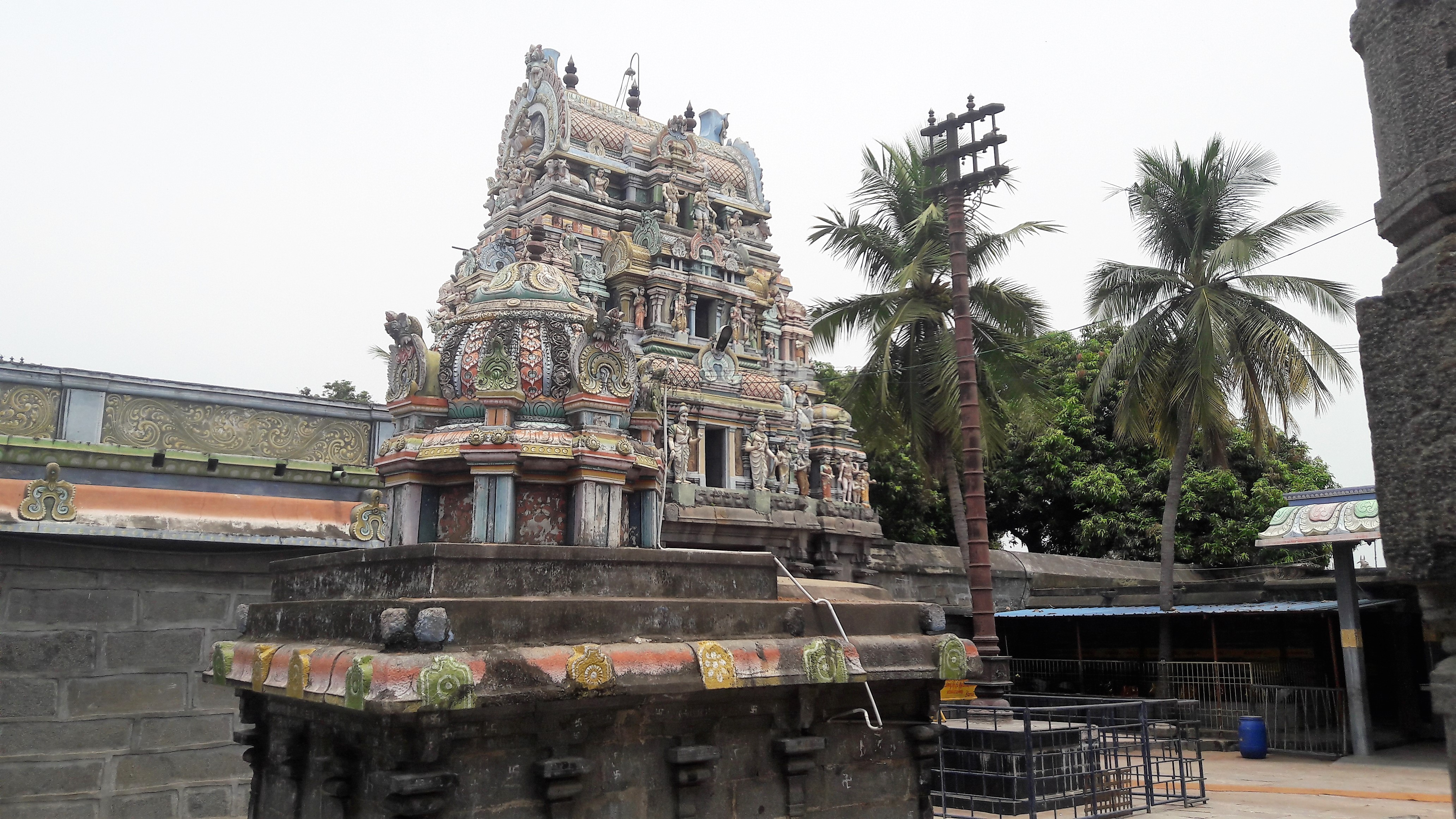
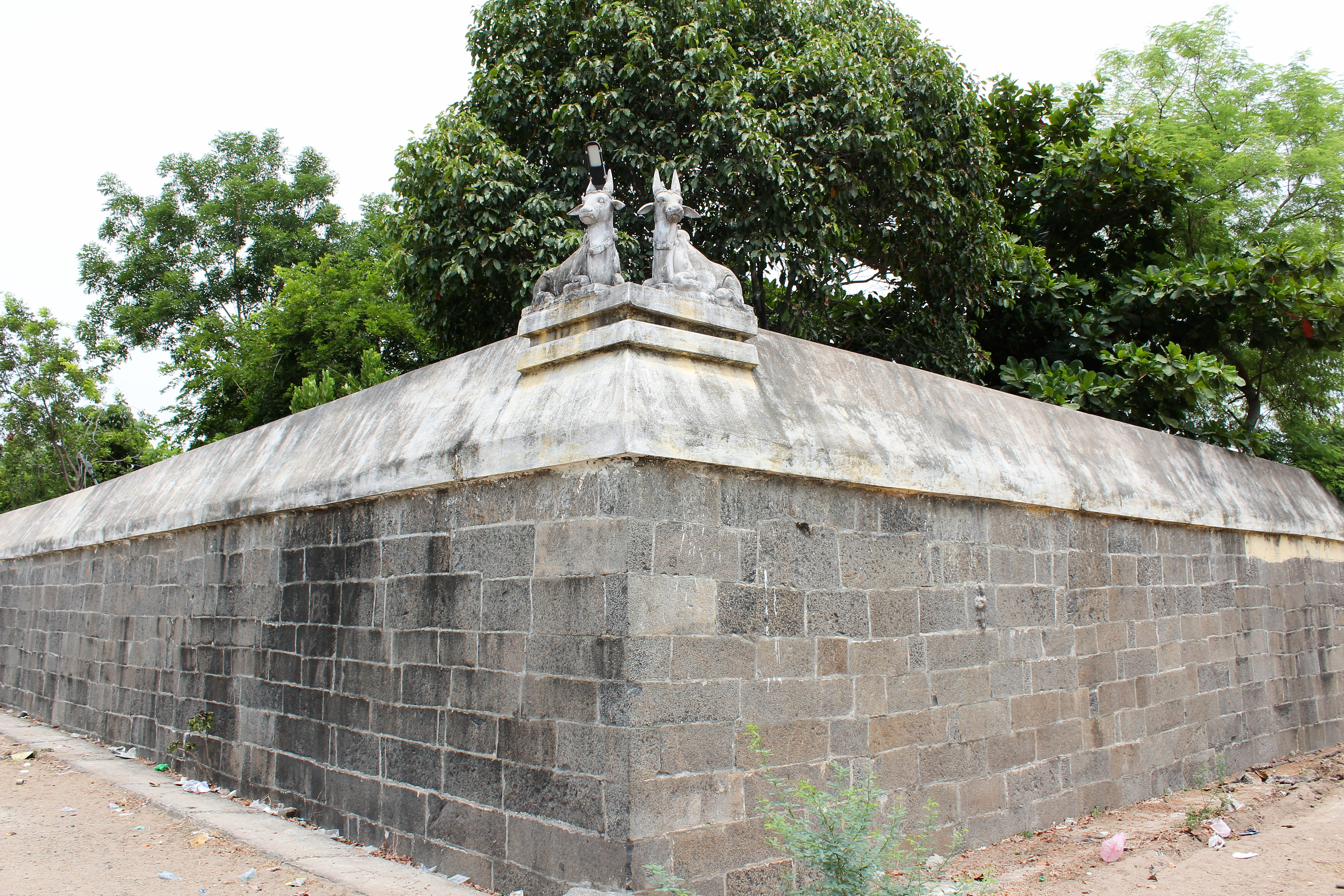
Shrines of the temple

The temple follows Saivite tradition. The temple priests perform the pooja (rituals) during festivals and on a daily basis. As at other Shiva temples of Tamil Nadu, the priests belong to the Shaivaite community, a Brahmin sub-caste. The temple rituals are performed four times a day: Kalasanthi at 8:30 a.m., Uchikalam at 11:30 p.m., Sayarakshai at 6:00 p.m., and Sayarakshai between 8:00 - 8:00 p.m. Each ritual has three steps: alangaram (decoration), neivethanam (food offering) and deepa aradanai (waving of lamps) for both Chandramowleeswarar and Amirthambigai.There are weekly, monthly and fortnightly rituals performed in the temple. The temple is open from 6am - 12 pm and 4-8:30 pm.

The Chitrapournami festival celebrated during the Tamil month of Panguni (April - May), float festival for Chandramouleeswarar during the Tamil month of Vaikasi and Kaanum Pongal festival during the Tamil month of Thai are the most prominent festivals celebrated in the temple. There are other common festivals like Shivaratri, Vinayaga Chaturthi, Vijayadasami and Karthigai Deepam celebrated in the temple. There is a wish tree in the compound having Naga, a snake representation. Childless ladies pray for the attaining child by placing or installing the stone symbols praying Vakrakali.

== Religious significance ==
From the verses of Thirumangai Alvar during the 8th-9th centuries on the temple of Thirunaraiyur indicate that there are seventy temples built by Kochengat Cholan during the Sangam period (3rd BCE to 3 CE). The Chandramowleeswarar temple is counted as one of the seventy Maadakovils built by Konchengannan. Tirugnana Sambandar, a 7th-century Tamil Saivite poet, venerated Chandramowleeswarar in ten verses in Tevaram, compiled as the First Tirumurai. Appar, a contemporary of Sambandar, also venerated Chandramowleeswarar in 10 verses in Tevaram, compiled as the Fifth Tirumurai. As the temple is revered in Tevaram, it is classified as Paadal Petra Sthalam, one of the 275 temples that find mention in the Saiva canon.
