= Thiruvakkarai =

Thiruvakkarai village Tiruvakkarai
- village
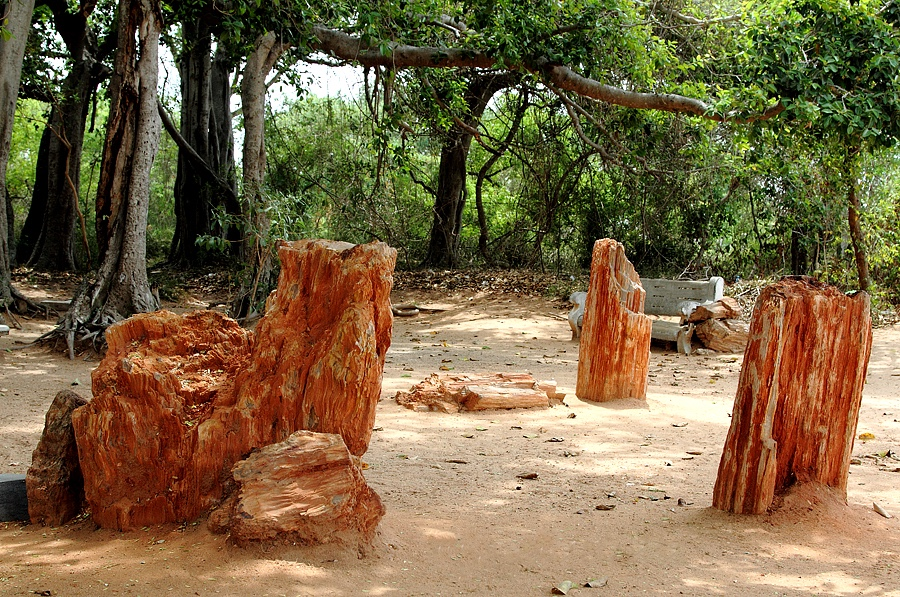
- Fossil Inside the National Fossil Wood Park

- Location in India
- Coordinates: 12°01′09″N 79°38′17″E
- Country: India
- State: Tamil Nadu
- Established: Established

Population (2011)
  - Total: 6,165

Languages
  - Official: Tamil
- Time zone: UTC+5:30 (IST)
- PIN: 604304
- Website: viluppuram.nic.in

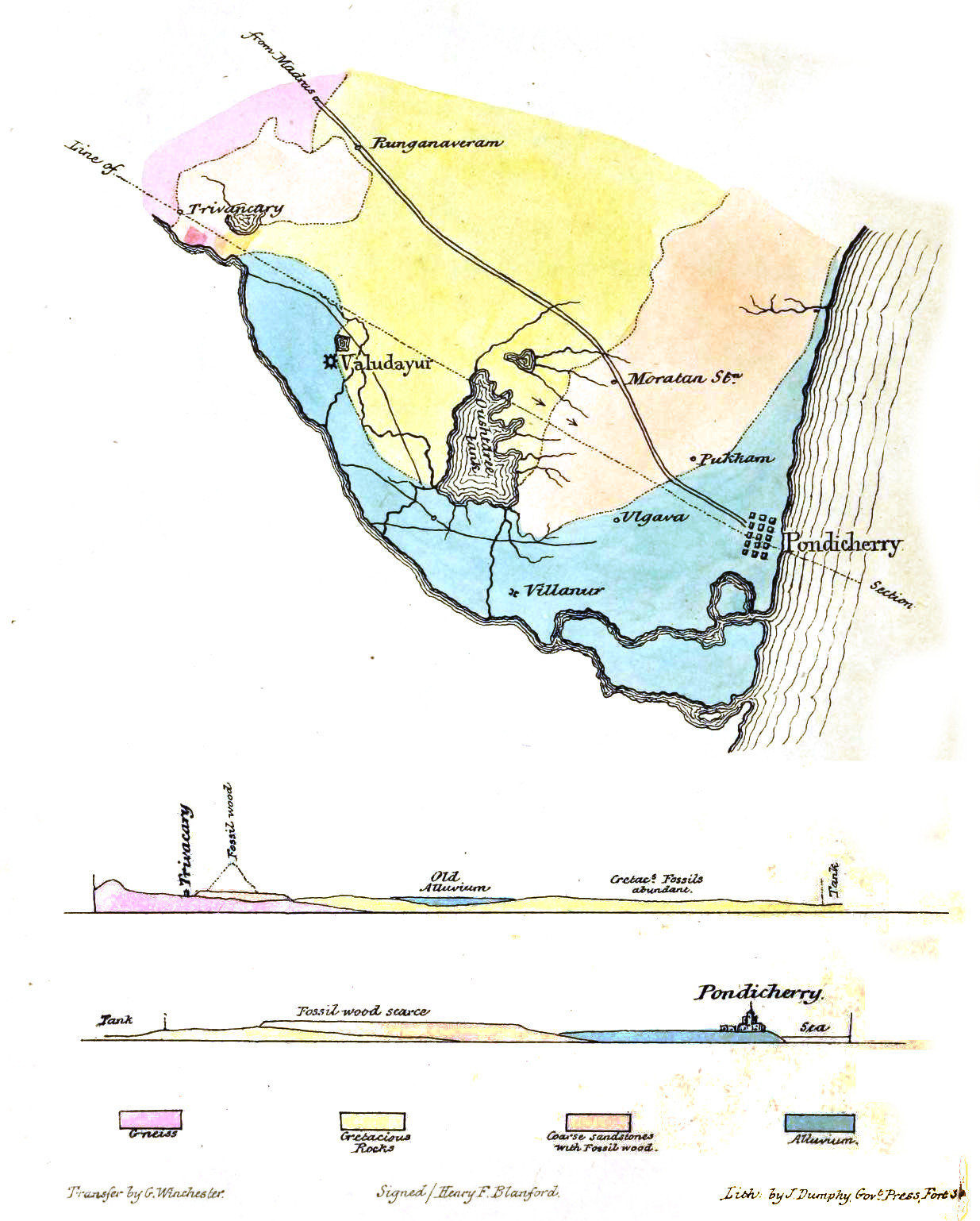
Map of the region and cross section described by H. F. Blanford in 1858

Thiruvakkarai (also spelled as Tiruvakkarai) is a village in the Vanur taluk of Viluppuram district of the Indian state of Tamil Nadu. Situated on the periphery of Auroville global township, it is the home of National Fossil Wood Park and Chandramouleeswar temple.

== Demographics ==
According to the 2011 census, it had a population of 3220. There were 986 women for every 1000 men. The taluk had a literacy rate of 68.73. Child population in the age group below 6 was 11,028 Males and 10,647 Females.

== See also ==
- Auroville
- National Fossil Wood Park
- Chandramouleeswar temple.
