= National Fossil Wood Park, Sathanur =

Fossil park and protected area in Sathanur, India

- A fossilised tree at the park

- Location within Tamil Nadu
- Location: Sathanur, Tamil Nadu, India
- Coordinates: 11°09′40.1″N 78°58′35.1″E
- Created: 1940; 86 years ago
- Operator: Geological Survey of India

National Geological Monuments of India
- Official name: National Fossil Wood Park, Sathanur
- Designated: 1951
- Designated by: Geological Survey of India

National Fossil Wood Park is a protected paleontological site in Sathanur in Perambalur district of the Indian state of Tamil Nadu. The park was established in 1940, and was notified as a National Geological Monument by the Geological Survey of India in 1951.

== Geography and history ==
The fossil park is located in Sathanur in Perambalur district, Tamil Nadu. The site was discovered by geologist M. S. Krishnan of the Geological Survey of India in 1940. The park was established in 1940, and was notified as a National Geological Monument by the Geological Survey of India in 1951. Part of the park is open to public.

== Fossils and geology ==
The park, located in the Kaveri basin, preserves petrified wood dating to the Upper Cretaceous period (about 100 Ma). One fossilised tree trunk measures over 18 m (59 ft) in length. The region is a pediplain formed by the erosion of Cretaceous rocks, with isolated hills of crystalline granulite rocks. The petrified trees, identified as conifers (gymnosperms), are embedded in the Kulakkalnattam Formation, a marine sedimentary rock sequence of Upper Cretaceous age. These rocks are interpreted to have formed in a coastal environment influenced by strong winds and tides. During the Upper Cretaceous period, there was a major rise in sea levels, known as marine transgression. Evidence of this is found in the Krishna, Godavari, and Kaveri river basins. As the sea levels receded, the marine organisms and the trees that were submerged, were fossilised. The Sathanur area contains several shallow-marine rocks with abundant fossils.

== See also ==
- Ghughua Fossil Park – National Park in Madhya Pradesh, India
- Mandla Plant Fossils National Park – National Park in Madhya Pradesh, India
- National Fossil Wood Park, Tiruvakkarai – Fossil park in Tiruvakkarai, India
- Shivalik Fossil Park – Fossil park in Saketi, India
