= Sathanur, Thiruvidaimarudur South =

Sathanur
- Town
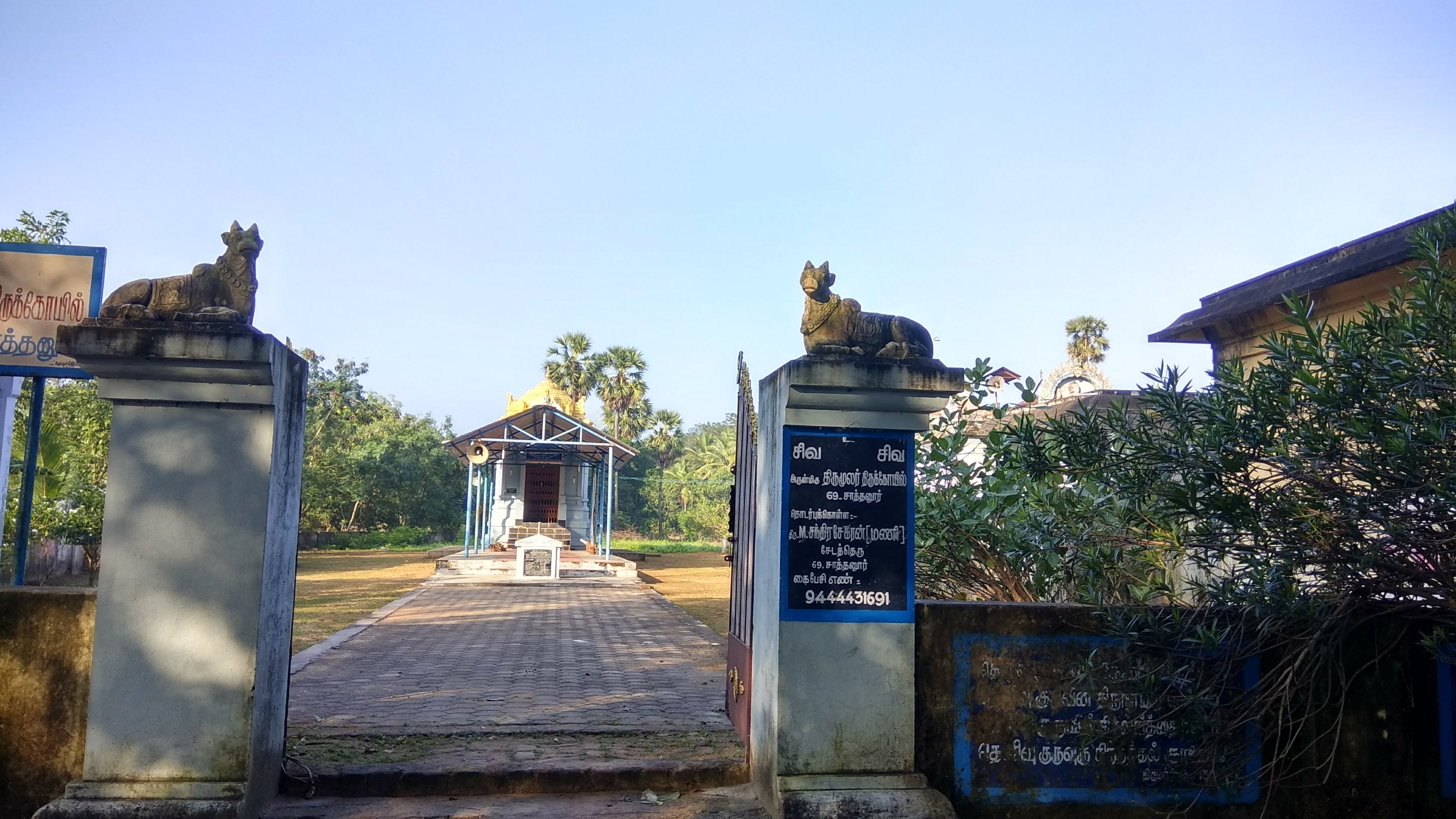
- Nickname: Shasthapuram
- Location in Tamil Nadu, India
- Coordinates: 10.98°N 79.47°E
- Country: India
- State: Tamil Nadu
- District: Thanjavur
- Elevation: 20 m (66 ft)

Population (2001)
  - Total: 13,758

Languages
  - Official: Tamil
- Time zone: UTC+5:30 (IST)
- PIN: 609802
- Telephone code: 0435
- Vehicle registration: TN.68

Sathanur is a panchayat town in Thanjavur district in the Indian state of Tamil Nadu. The town contains the Tirumular Temple, a Hindu shrine.
