= Indroda Dinosaur and Fossil Park =

Dinosaur and Fossil Park in Gandhinagar, Gujarat, India

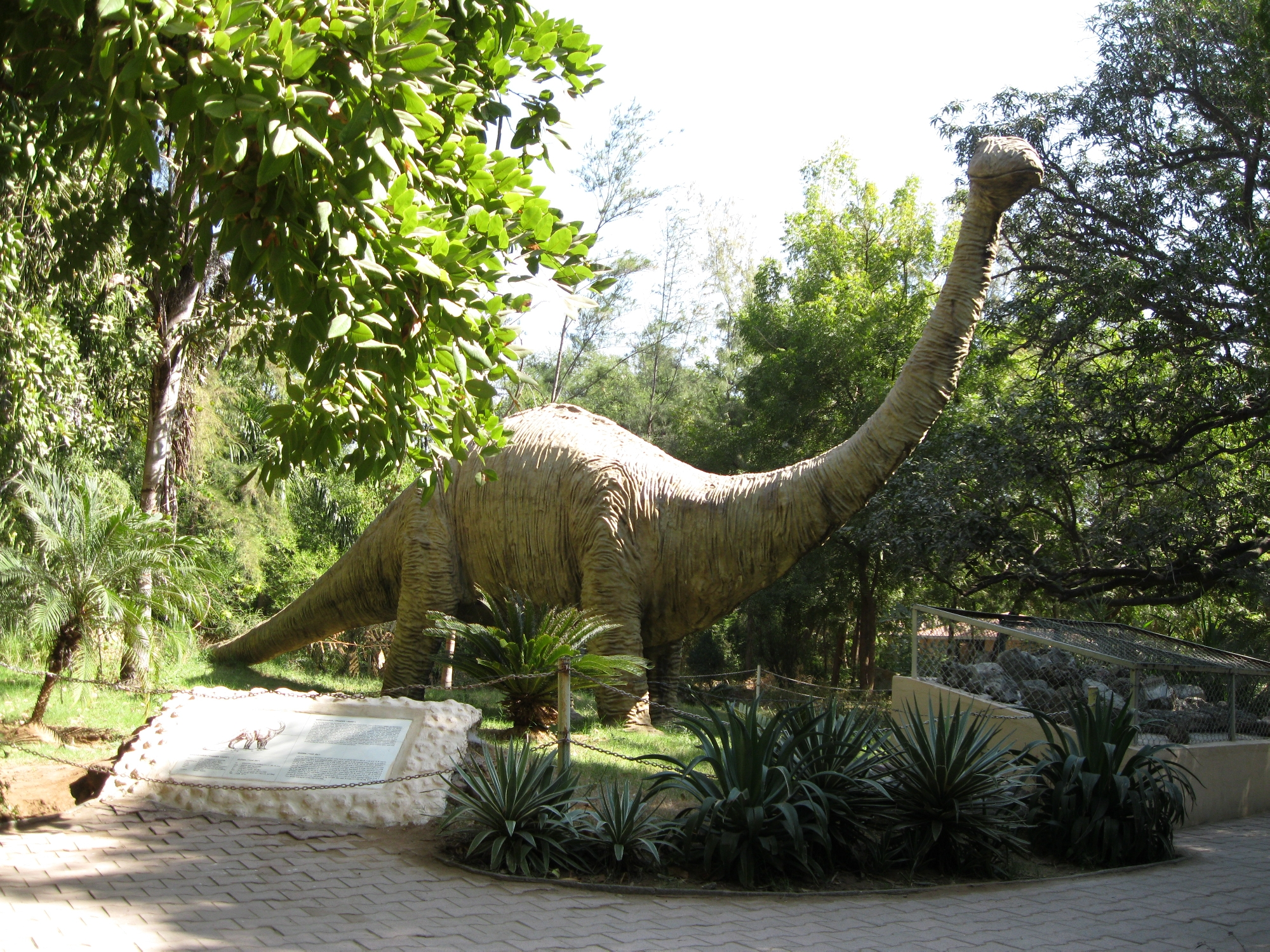
- Indroda Dinosaur and Fossil Park
- Interactive map of Indroda Dinosaur and Fossil Park
- Location: Gandhinagar, Gujarat, India
- Coordinates: 23.192°N 72.648°E
- Status: Operating
- Opened: 1970
- Owner: Gujarat Ecological and Research Foundation
- Theme: Science education and entertainment
- Operating season: Year-round
- Area: 400 ha (990 acres)

The Indroda Dinosaur and Fossil Park in Gandhinagar, Gujarat, India, is a park that houses fossilized remains and petrified eggs of dinosaurs. It is a man-made fossil park and not the actual nesting grounds where the dinosaurs lived. The eggs and fossils on display here are from the world's 3rd-largest dinosaur fossil excavation site and 2nd-largest hatchery at Raiyoli, Balasinor, Gujarat. The Park was set up by the Geological Survey of India and is the only dinosaur museum in the country.

== History ==
In 1970, the Forest Department of the Gujarat Government began its planting and restoration efforts. The park, also known as India's Jurassic Park, is 428 hectares in size and contains sections such as the dinosaur section, fossil section, etc. Now, the park is managed by the Gujarat Ecological and Research Foundation (GEER).

The oldest record of dinosaur bone fossils is of middle Jurassic period, and they are found from Patcham formation of Kutch basin. The fossils which were found in Upper Cretaceous formations in the region date back 66 million years. The eggs are of different sizes, some the size of cannonballs. Fossil trackways of these gargantuan animals are also on display in the park.

Dinosaurs that are on display include Tyrannosaurus rex, Megalosaurus, Titanosaurus, Barapasaurus, Brachiosaurus, Antarctosaurus, Stegosaurus and Iguanodon. The park displays life-size models of the dinosaurs along with details of each period in which they existed and the characteristics of the animals.

The fossils were found in the Songhir Bagh Basin, the Himatnagar basin of Balasinor, south-eastern parts of Kheda, Panchmahal and Vadodara districts of the state.

== Gallery ==
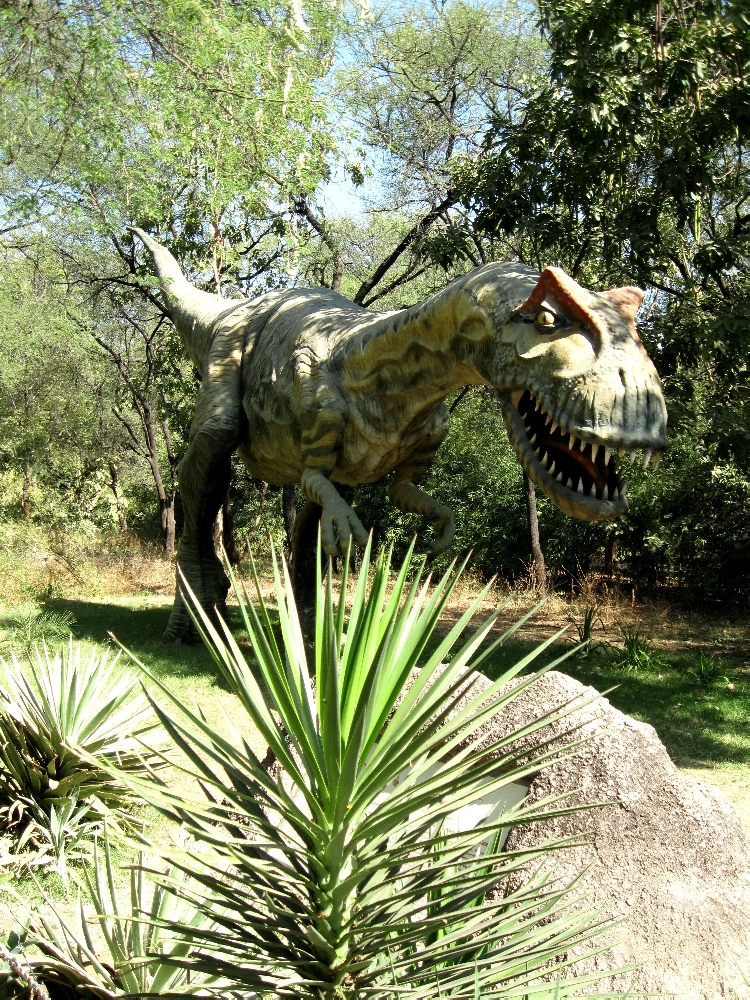
Indroda Dinosaur and Fossil Park, Gandhinagar

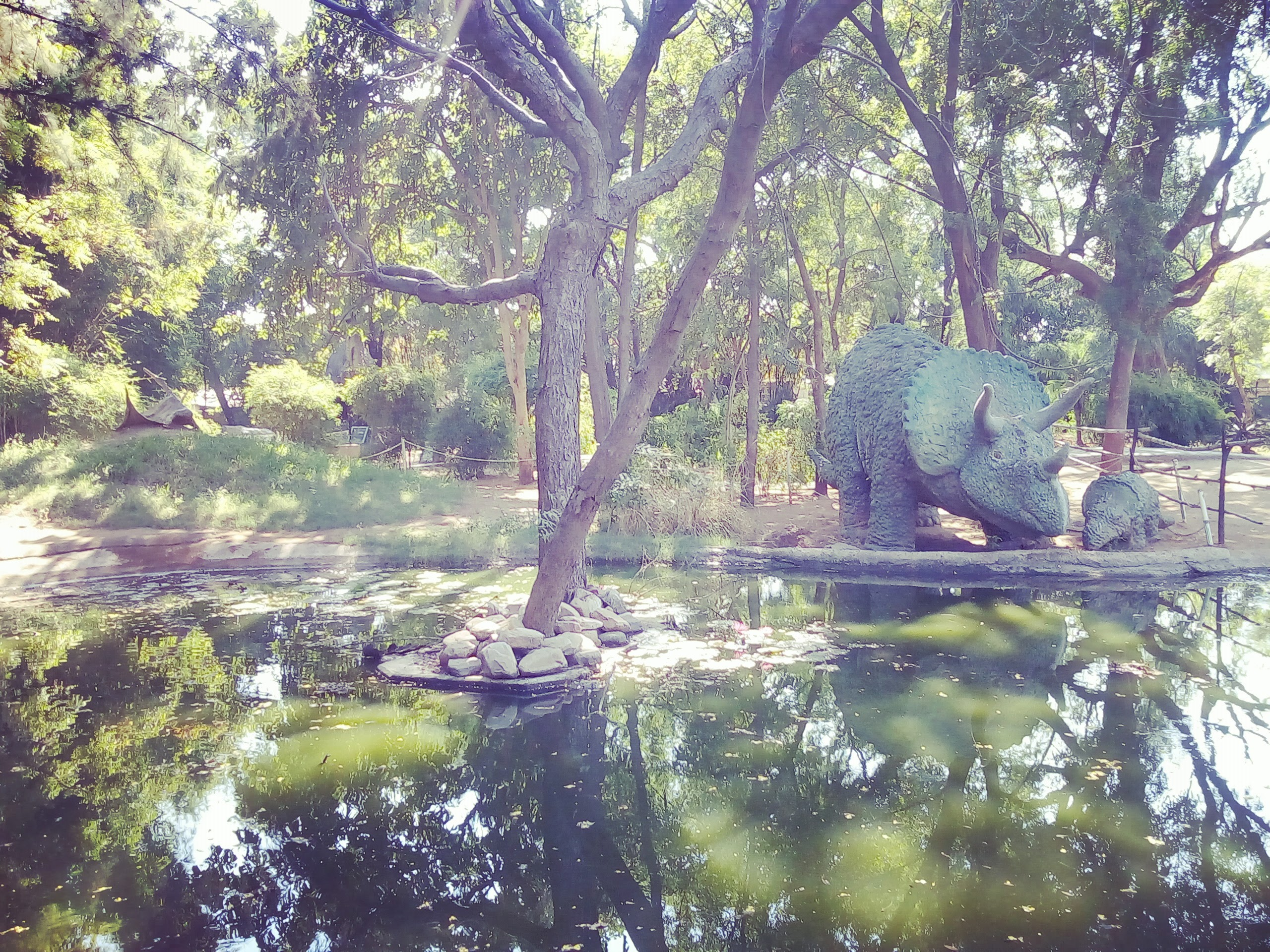
Indroda Dinosaur and Fossil Park, Gandhinagar

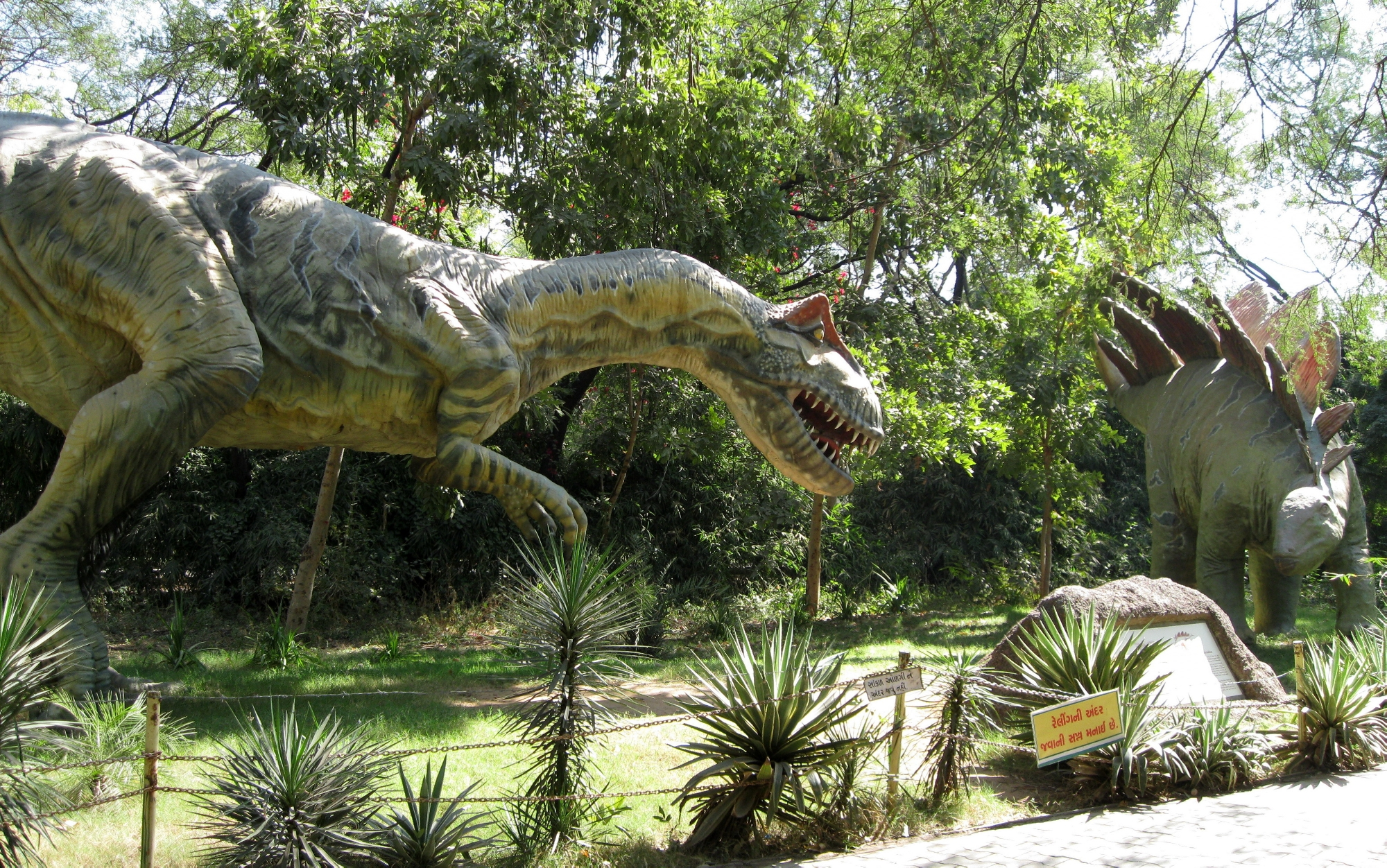
Indroda Dinosaur and Fossil Park, Gandhinagar

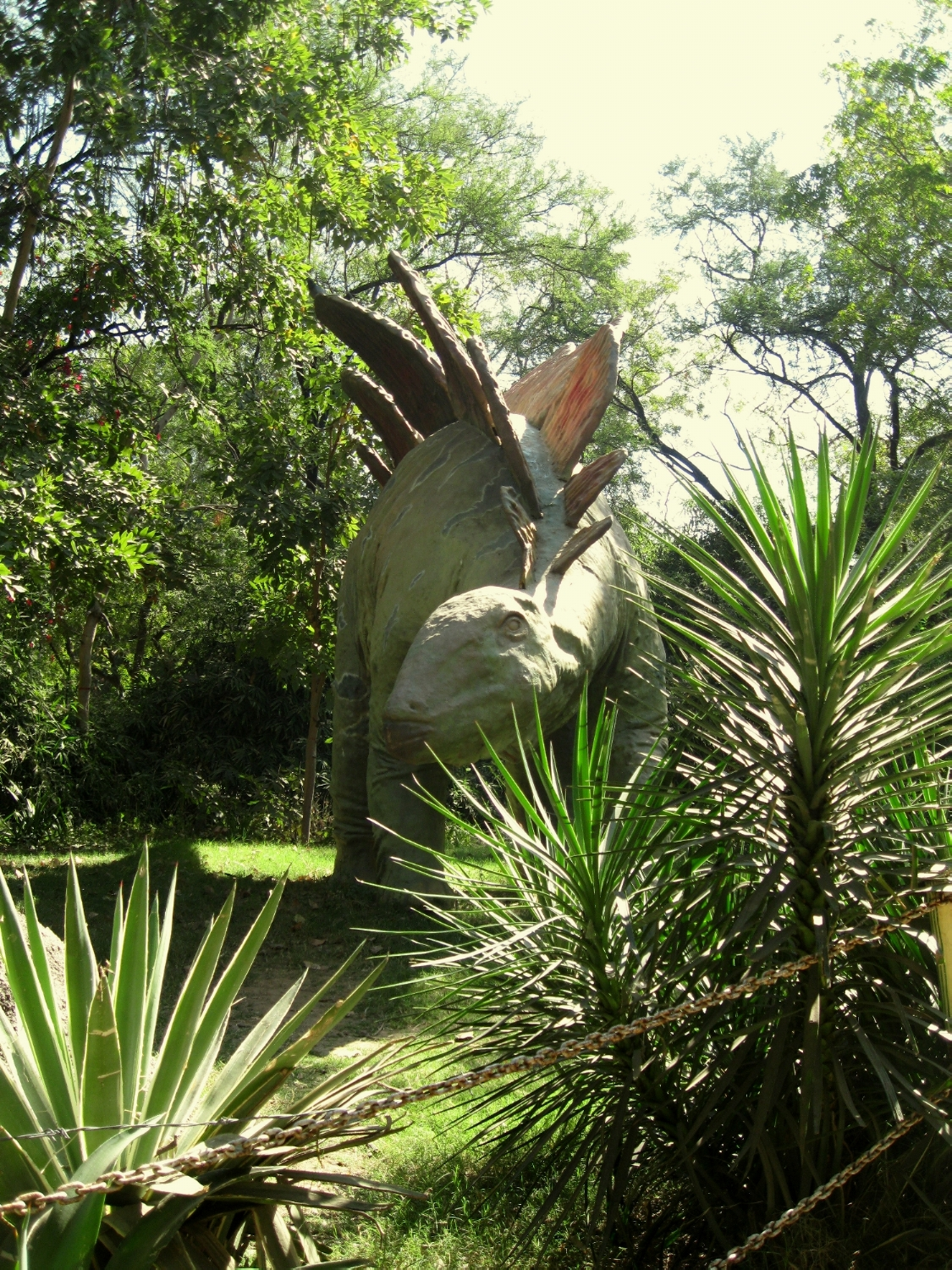
Indroda Dinosaur and Fossil Park, Gandhinagar

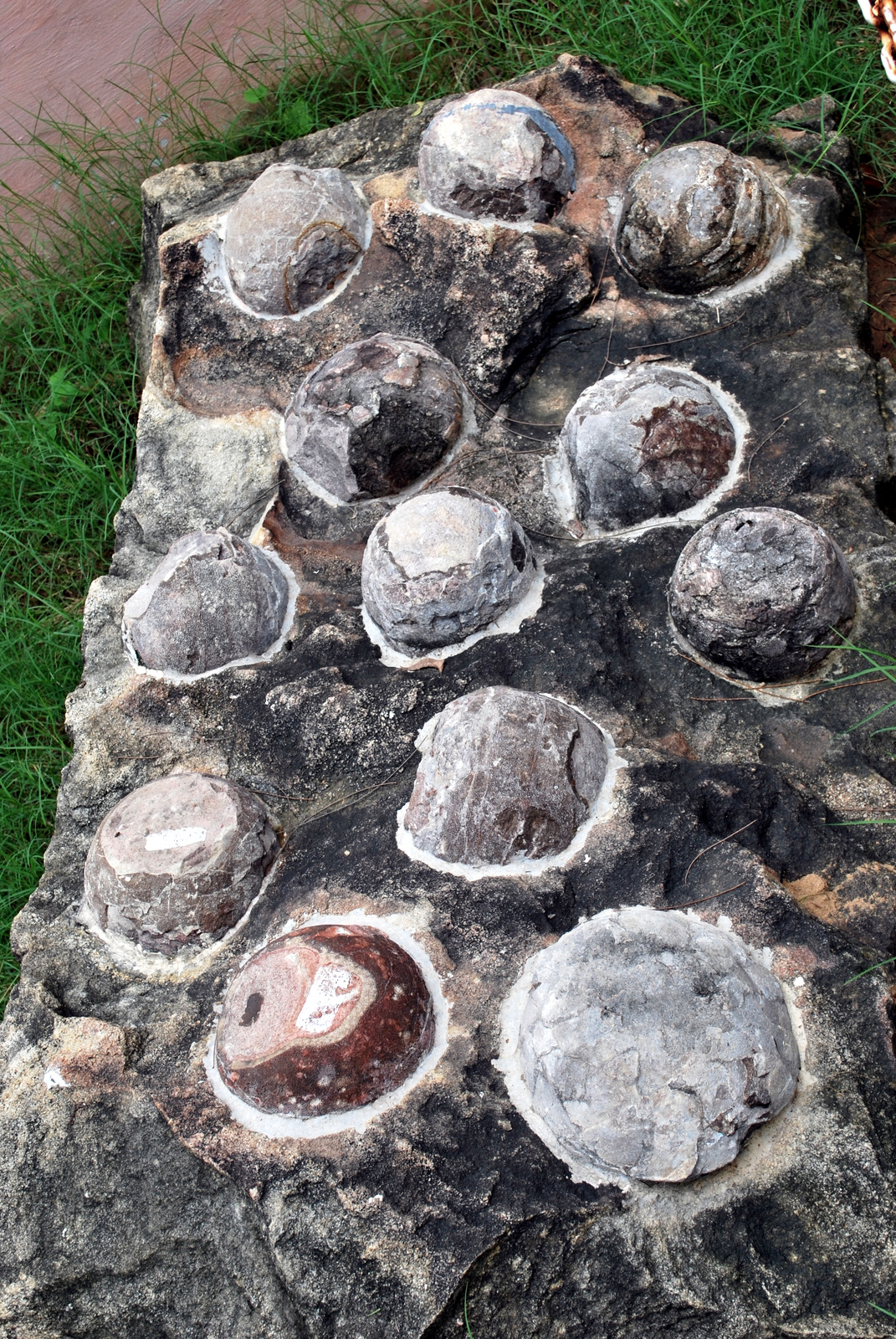
Fossilized Dinosaur eggs displayed at Indroda Fossil Park

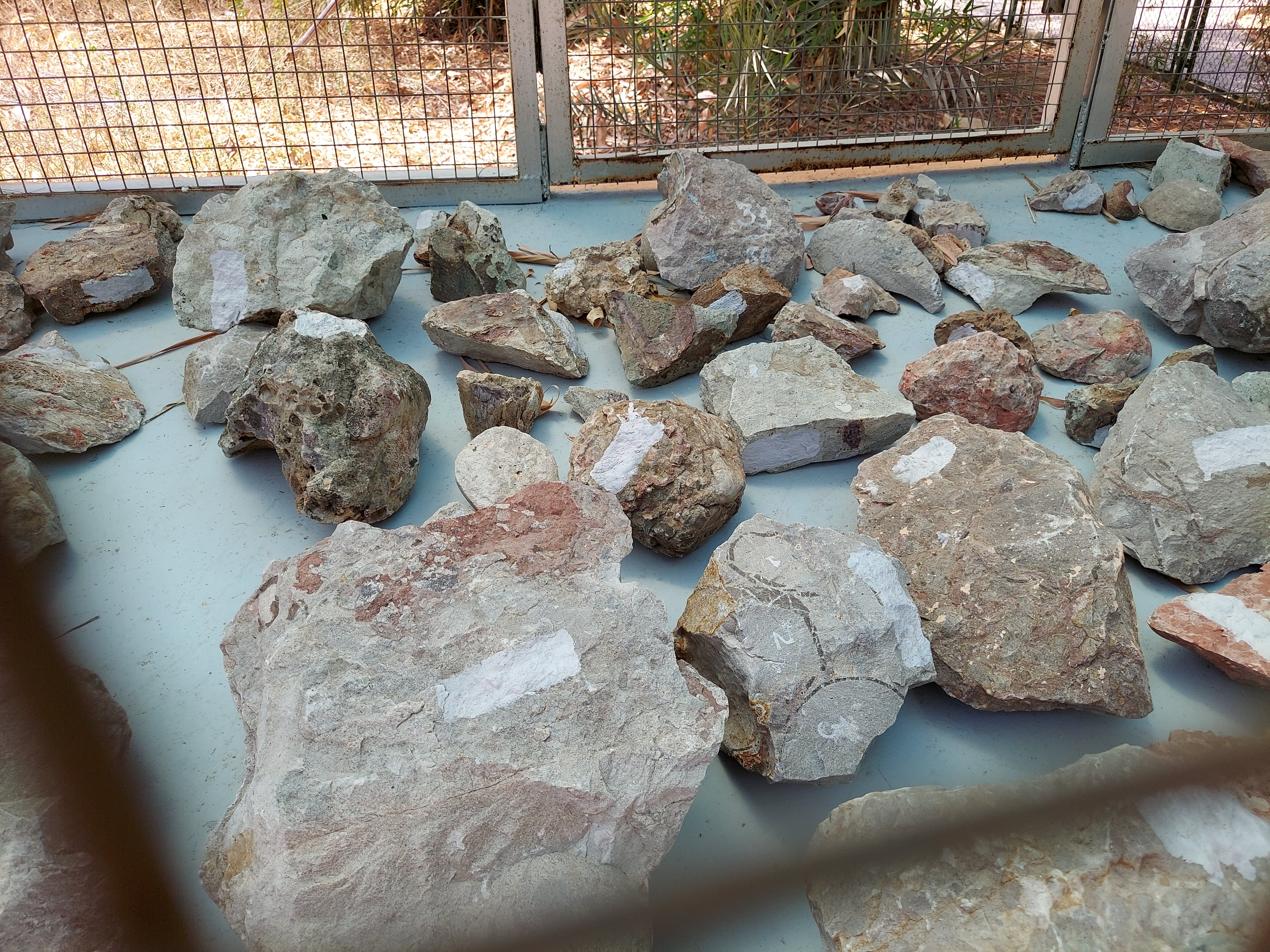
Fossilized Dinosaur eggs displayed at Indroda Fossil Park

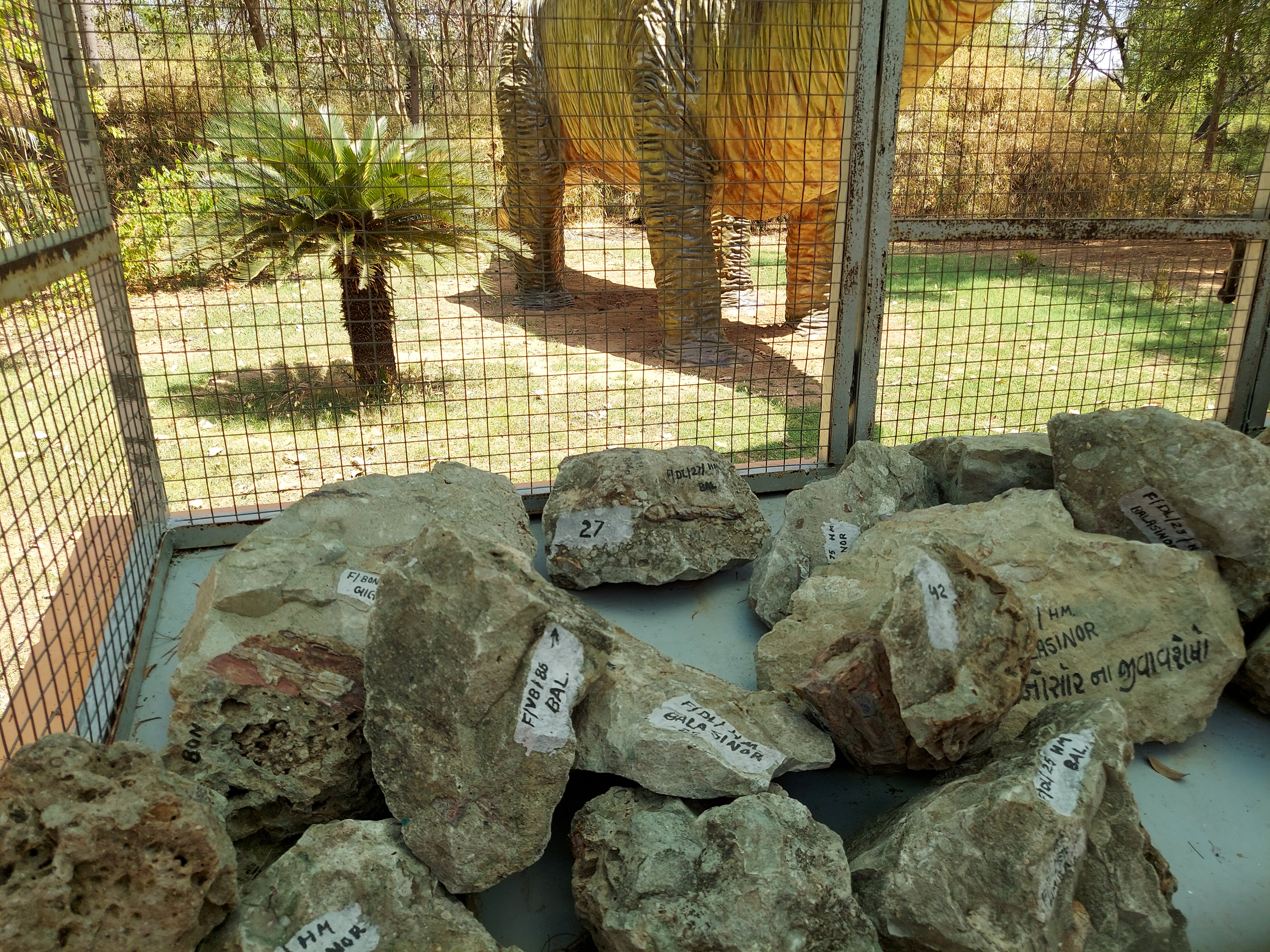
Fossilized Dinosaur eggs displayed at Indroda Fossil Park
