= Shivalik Fossil Park =

Fossil park in Saketi, India

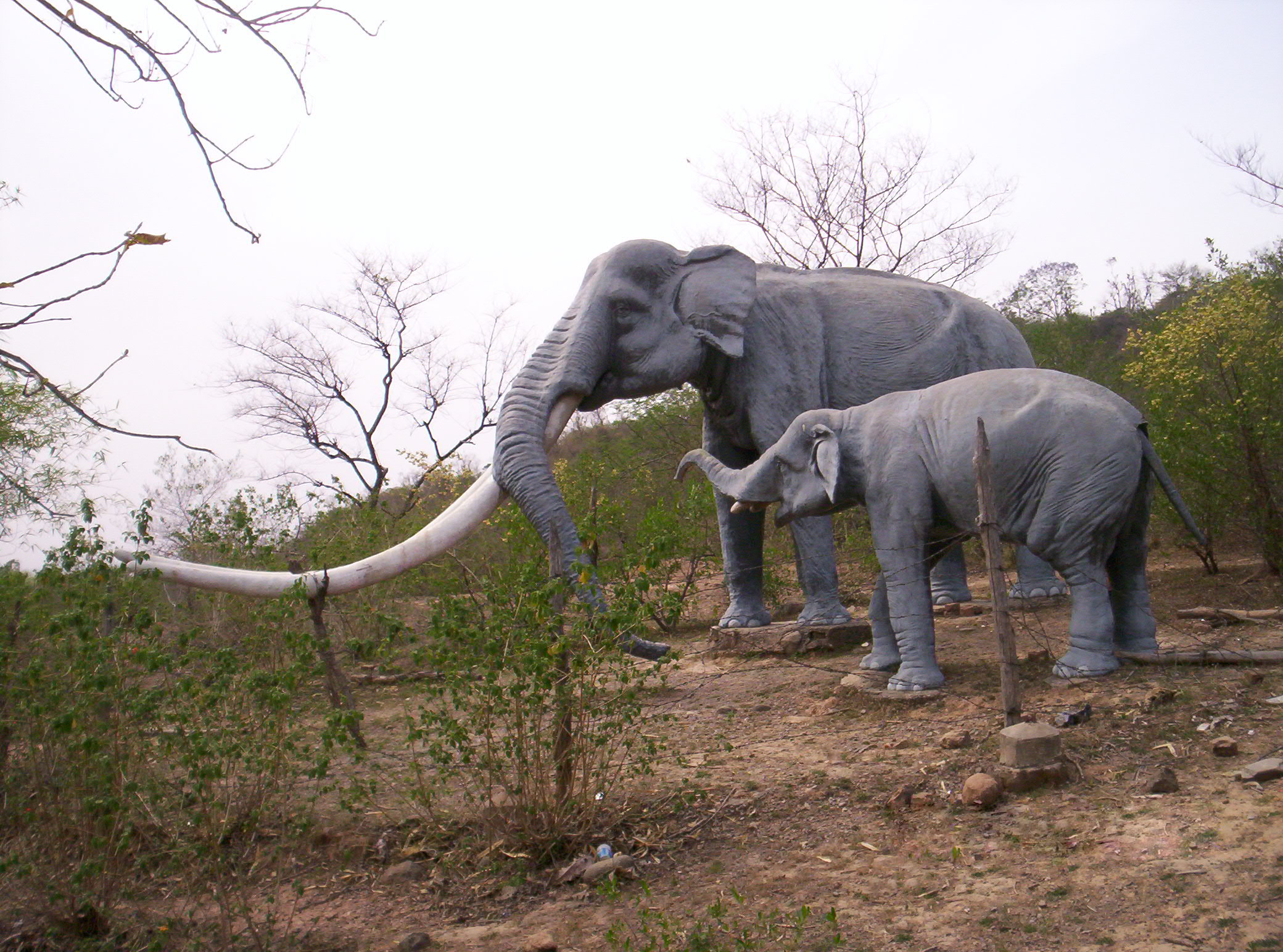
- Model of the extinct Stegodon at the park

- Location within Himachal Pradesh
- Location: Saketi, Sirmaur district, Himachal Pradesh, India
- Coordinates: 30°38′24″N 77°26′24″E
- Created: 1969
- Operator: Geological Survey of India; Government of Himachal Pradesh

National Geological Monuments of India
- Official name: Shivalik Fossil Park
- Designated: 1974
- Designated by: Geological Survey of India

Shivalik Fossil Park, also known as the Suketi Fossil Park, is a protected paleontological site in Suketi in Sirmaur district in the Indian state of Himachal Pradesh. The park was notified as a National Geological Monument by the Geological Survey of India in 1974. It contains prehistoric vertebrate fossils and skeletons recovered from the Siwaliks. The park displays these fossil finds along with six life-sized fiberglass models of extinct mammals, recreated in a Plio-Pleistocene landscape dating to about 2.5 Ma. A museum within the park houses and exhibits the fossils.

== Geography and history ==
The fossil park is located in Saketi in Sirmaur district, Himachal Pradesh. It is located in the Markanda River valley, in the Siwalik range of the Himalayas. The park, extensively forested, is spread out over an area of 15 km^{2} (5.8 sq mi) at Suketi.

The site was discovered by the Geological Survey of India in 1969 and the park was established in association with the Government of Himachal Pradesh on 23 March 1974. It was notified as a National Geological Monument in the same year.

== Fossils and geology ==
The park is located on rocks of the Saketi Formation, which forms the lower part of the Upper Siwalik Subgroup and Tatrot Formation of the Middle Siwalik sequence, dating to the Upper Pliocene (about 5.3–2.6 Ma). It rocks of the Siwalik Group, dating to Middle Miocene and Pleistocene (10 to 1.5 Ma), contain several fossils. The Siwaliks are the southernmost and geologically youngest division of the Himalayas. It is mainly composed of mudstone, sandstone, and conglomerate rock formations. The park provides a miniature representation of the prehistoric biological record preserved in the Upper Siwalik rocks. The park preserves a collection of fossils recovered from Saketi and nearby areas.

== Features ==
=== Museum ===
The Siwalik Fossil Museum was opened in May 2014 in the premises of the park. The museum exhibits skeletal and fossil remains of prehistoric biota from across India. These include fossilised jaws and skulls of the extinct species such as Stegodon insignis, Stegodon ganesa, Hexaprotodon sivalensis, Enhydriodon sivalensis, Colossochelys atlas, Gavialis browni, Sivatherium giganteum, and Paramachairodus sp. The collection also includes fossil turtle shells, ancient fish remains, skulls and teeth of crocodilians. The museum also displays stone tools used by Early Paleolithic humans, dating back about 2.5 Ma and recovered from the Indian subcontinent. It also houses antiquities discovered by Proby Cautley in the area, including remains considered to be among the oldest evidence of human ancestors in Asia.

=== Mammalian models ===
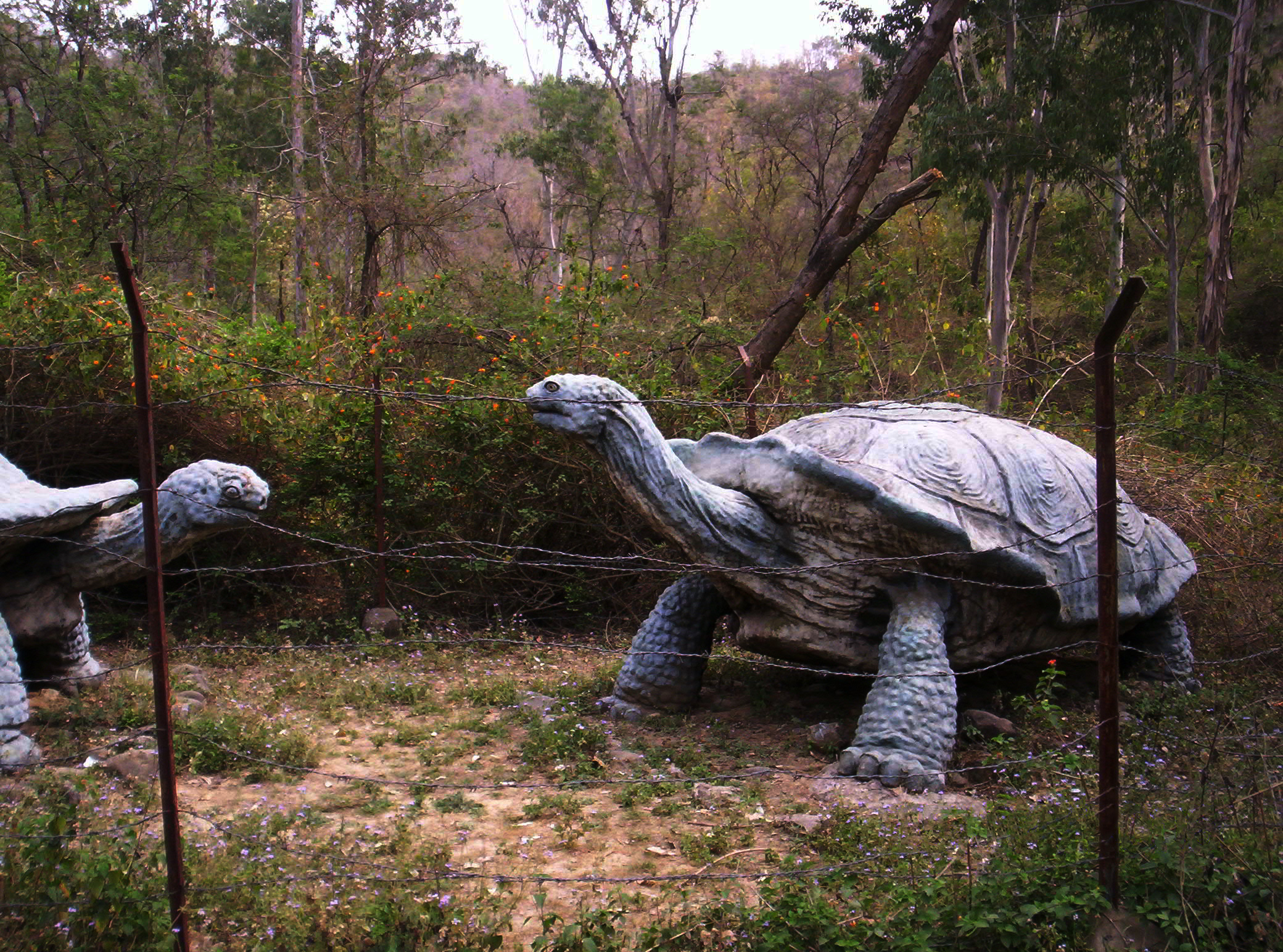
Life–size model of an extinct giant tortoise

The park displays six life-sized fiberglass models of prehistoric animals that lived in the region about millions of years ago. These include a sabre-toothed cat, which had very long upper canine teeth and became extinct about a million years ago; a hippopotamid with a large mouth, small brain cavity, long lower jaw and short, pig-like legs; and a giant tortoise that was much larger than its modern relatives. The park also displays models of giant proboscians that lived in the region between about 7 and 1.5 million years ago. They had smaller skulls, very long tusks and large limbs compared with modern elephants. Another model represents a four-horned giraffe that lived in the region during the same period and had a large skull and relatively short neck. The last of these models feature an extinct crocodilian species from the gharial family. These models are placed in a recreated landscape representing the environment of the Plio-Pleistocene period.

== See also ==
- Ghughua Fossil Park – National Park in Madhya Pradesh, India
- Kalesar National Park – Protected area in Haryana, India
- Khol Hi-Raitan Wildlife Sanctuary – Protected area in Haryana, India
- Marine Gondwana Fossil Park
- Mandla Plant Fossils National Park – National Park in Madhya Pradesh, India
- National Fossil Wood Park, Sathanur – Fossil park and protected area in Sathanur, India
- National Fossil Wood Park, Tiruvakkarai – Fossil park in Tiruvakkarai, India
