= Sathanur, Perambalur =

Sathanur
- Village Panchayath
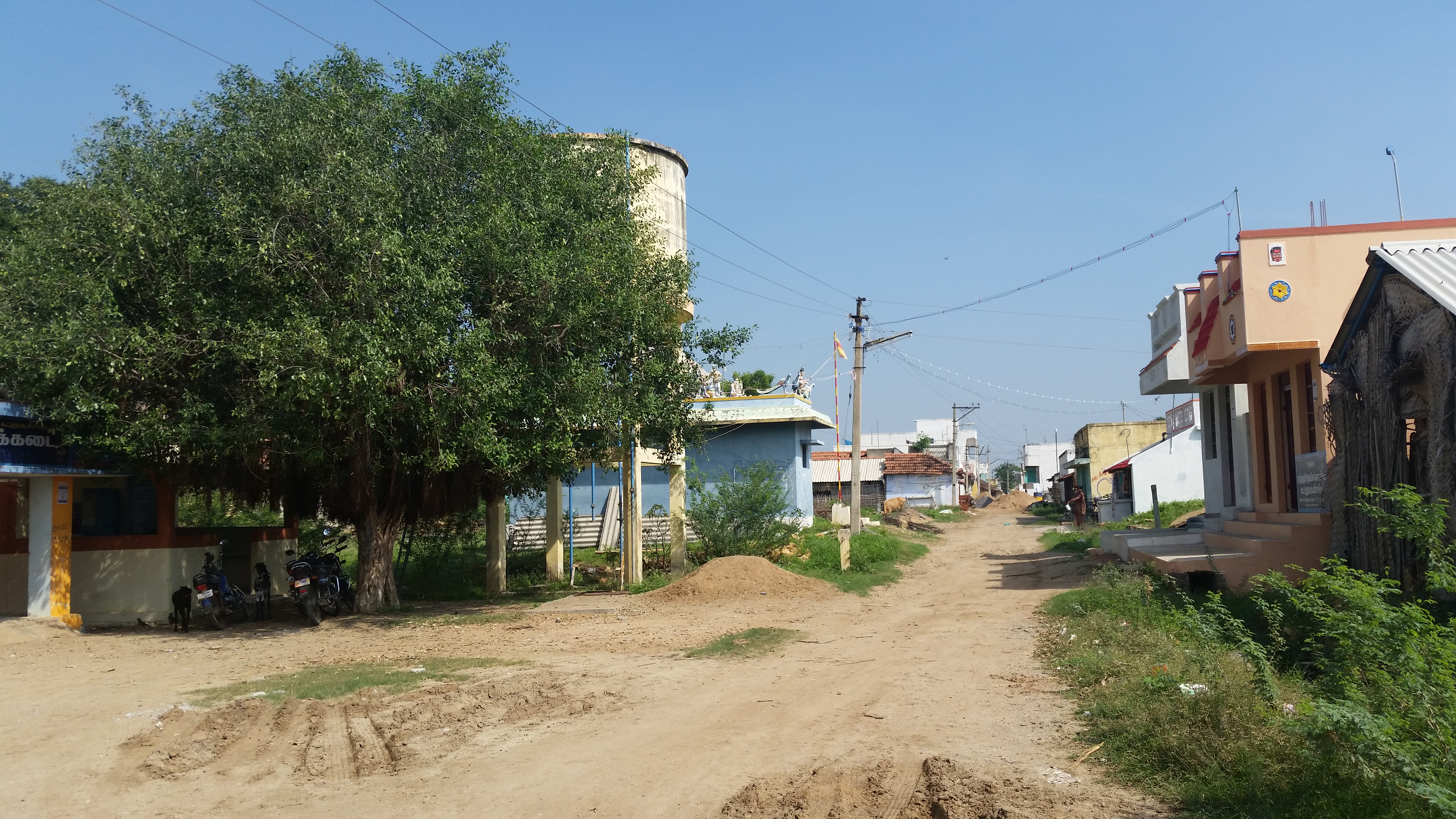

- Location within Tamil Nadu Location within India
- Coordinates: 11°09′17.2″N 78°58′29.6″E
- Country: India
- State: Tamil Nadu
- Region: Chola Nadu
- District: Perambalur
- Taluk: Alathur
- Village: Sathanur
- Established: 1???

Languages
  - Official: Tamil
- Time zone: UTC+5:30 (IST)
- PIN: 621106

Sathanur is a village in Alathur Taluk, Perambalur District, Tamilnadu India.

It is home to the National Fossil Wood Park, Sathanur. The fossil tree was formed 12 million years ago, and has been declared a national geological monument by the Geological Survey of India.

== Population ==
The population in the village of Sathanur was 1,749, consisting of 875 males and 874 females, according to the census of 2011 by Indian Government. There were 173 children under the age of six, 93 male and 80 female. There were 495 households in Sathanur at that time.

The number of members of Scheduled Castes was 661. There were no members of Scheduled Tribes.

== Literacy rate ==
648 males and 493 females were literate, leaving 608 illiterates.

== Workers ==
506 males and 518 females were workers, for a total of 1024. Of these, 937 were regular and 87 were irregular i.e., only worked a few days per month. There are 725 non-workers.

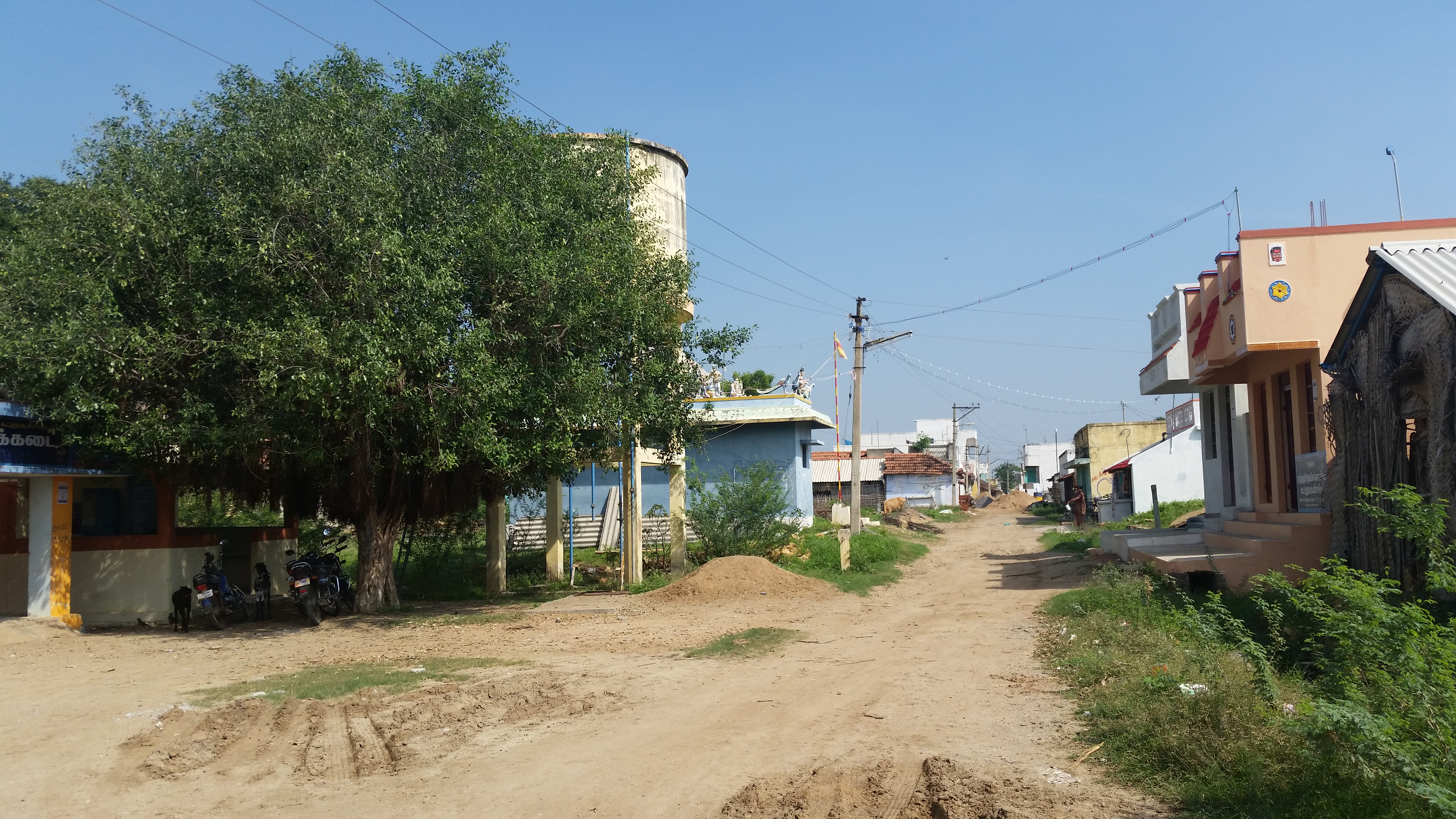
Sathanur Village entrance from the west
