= National Fossil Wood Park, Tiruvakkarai =

Fossil park in Tiruvakkarai, India

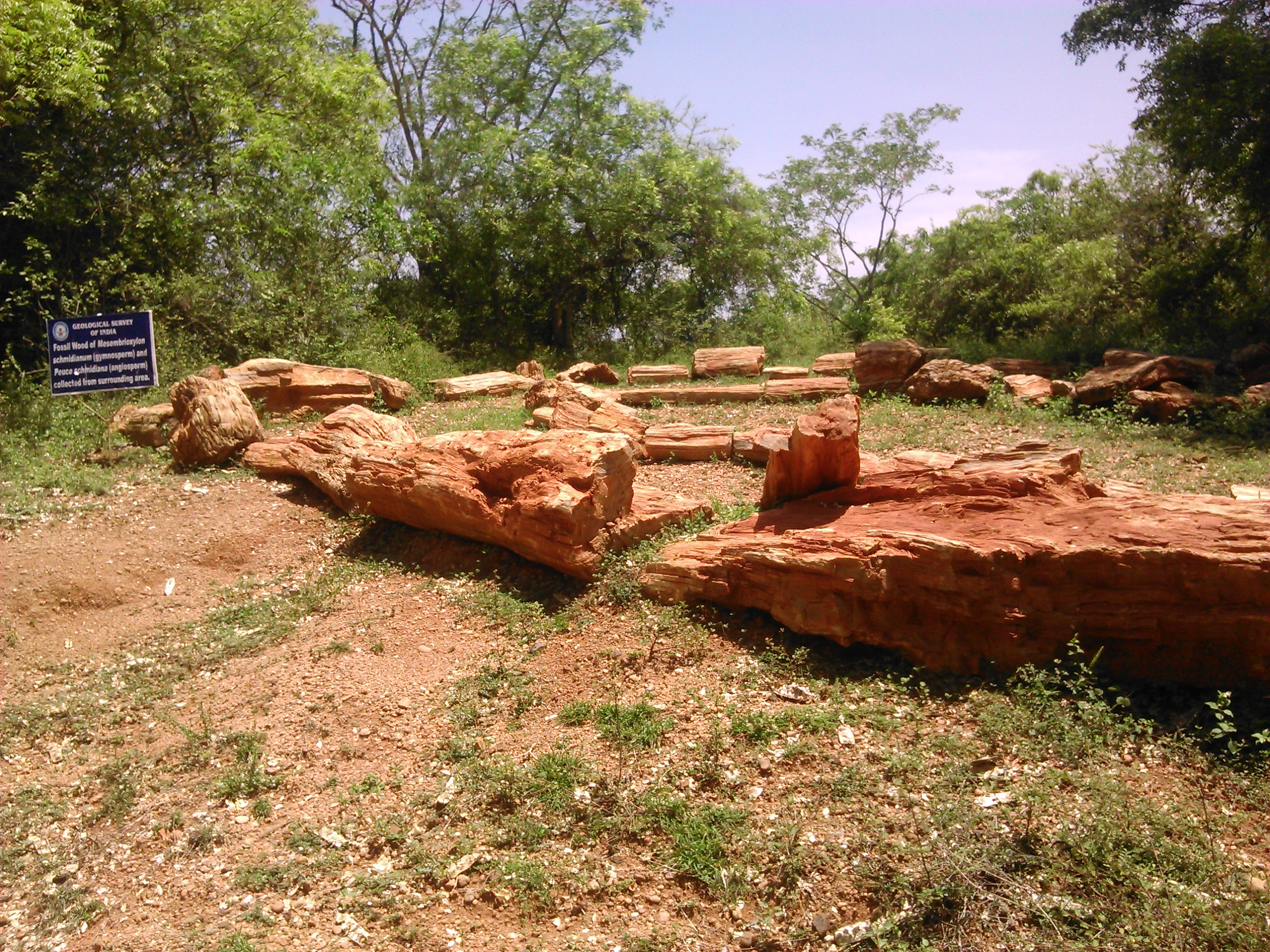

- Location within Tamil Nadu
- Location: Thiruvakkarai, Tamil Nadu, India
- Coordinates: 12°01′09″N 79°39′12″E
- Area: 247 acres (100 ha)
- Created: 1940; 86 years ago
- Operator: Geological Survey of India

National Geological Monuments of India
- Official name: National Fossil Wood Park, Tiruvakkarai
- Designated: 1951
- Designated by: Geological Survey of India

The National Fossil Wood Park is a protected paleontological site in Thiruvakkarai in the Villupuram district of the Indian state of Tamil Nadu. The park was established in 1940, and was notified as a National Geological Monument by the Geological Survey of India in 1951.

== Geography and history ==
The fossil park is located in Thiruvakkarai in Villupuram district, Tamil Nadu. It is spread over 247 acres (100 ha) and divided into nine enclaves. A part of the park is open to the public.

M. Sonneret, a European naturalist, gave the first detailed account of the fossils in 1781. The park was established in 1940, and was notified as a National Geological Monument by the Geological Survey of India in 1951.

== Fossils and geology ==
The park contains about 200 petrified woods and fossilised trees ranging in length from 3–15 m (9.8–49.2 ft) and up to 5 m (16 ft) in girth. They are strewn and partially buried in the park grounds, with no remnants of any branches or leaves on the fossilised trunks. The fossils lie horizontally, embedded in Cuddalore sandstone, dating to the Miocene–Pliocene (20 Ma). The fossils are generally classified as belonging to Mesembrioxylon schmidianum (gymnosperm) and Peuce schmidiana (angiosperm). These species are likely related to several modern plant families such as Guttiferae, Leguminosae, Anacardiaceae, Sonneratiaceae, and Euphorbiaceae. The trees are believed to have been transported by rivers during a massive flooding and later fossilised after the wood was replaced by silica from the sediments. The fossils are well preserved due to extensive petrifaction, with the trees' annular rings and pit structures clearly visible, allowing their age to be determined by counting the rings.

== Gallery ==
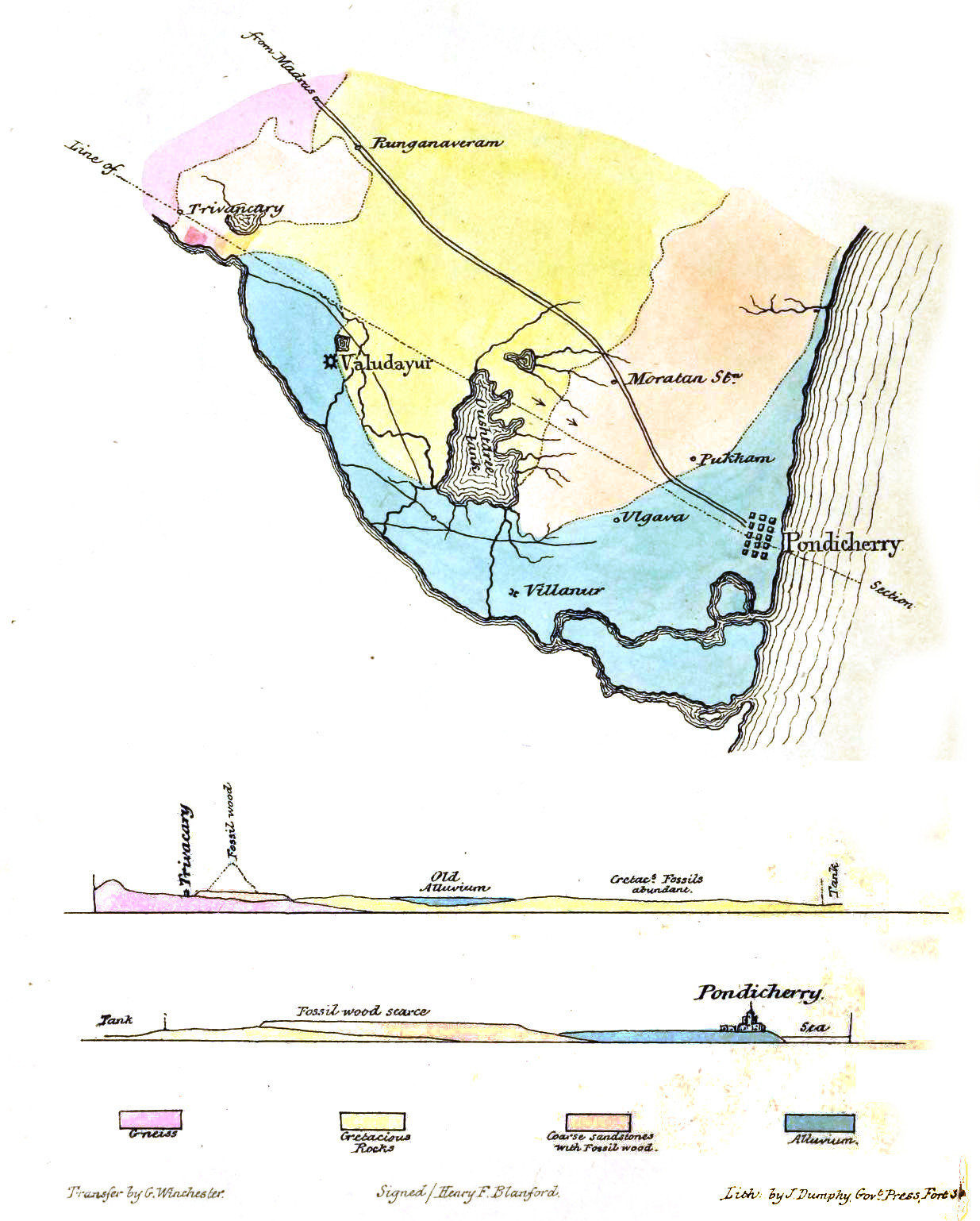
Map of the region as described by H. F. Blanford in 1858

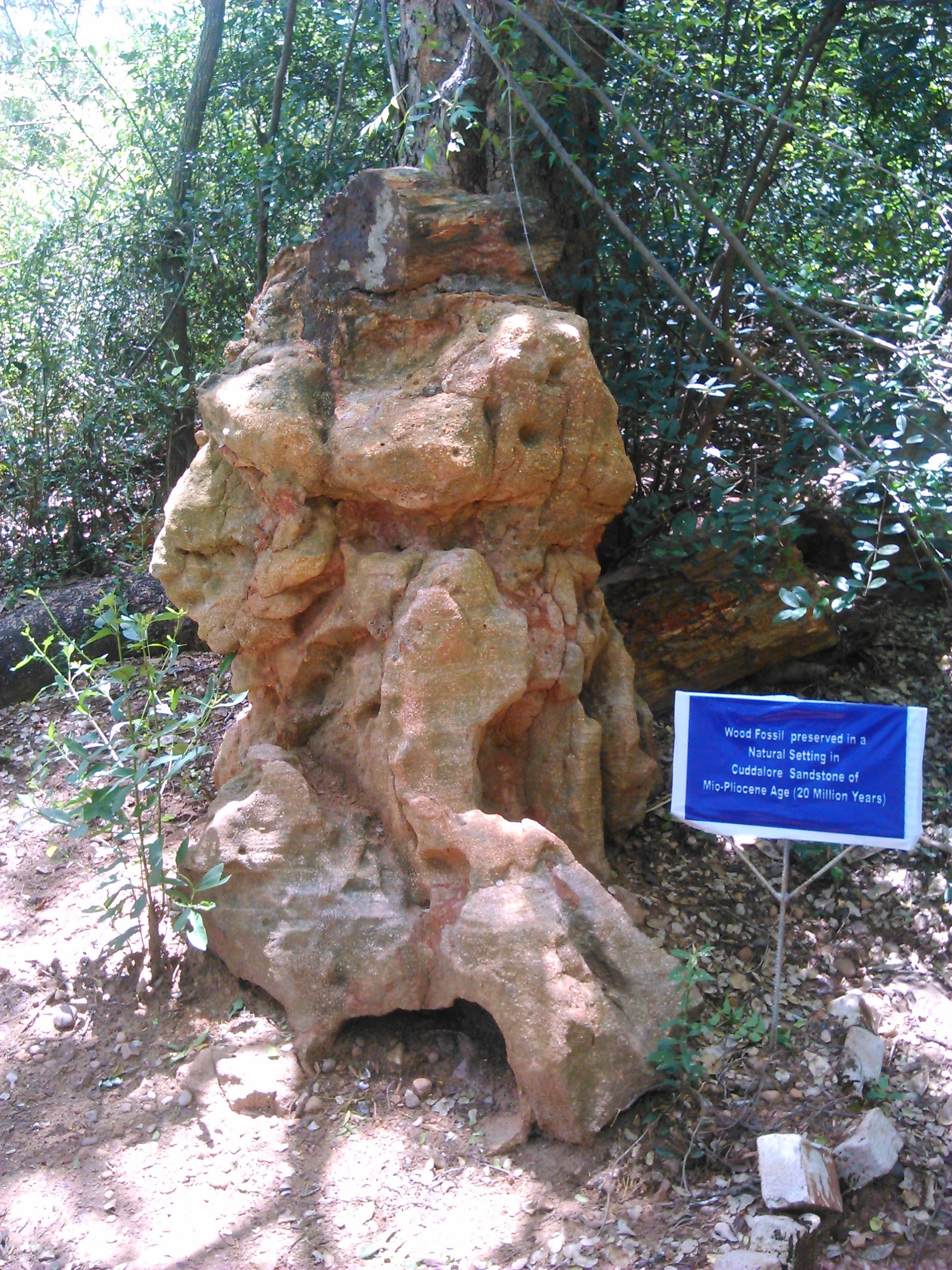
Wood fossil preserved in sandstone dating 20 Ma

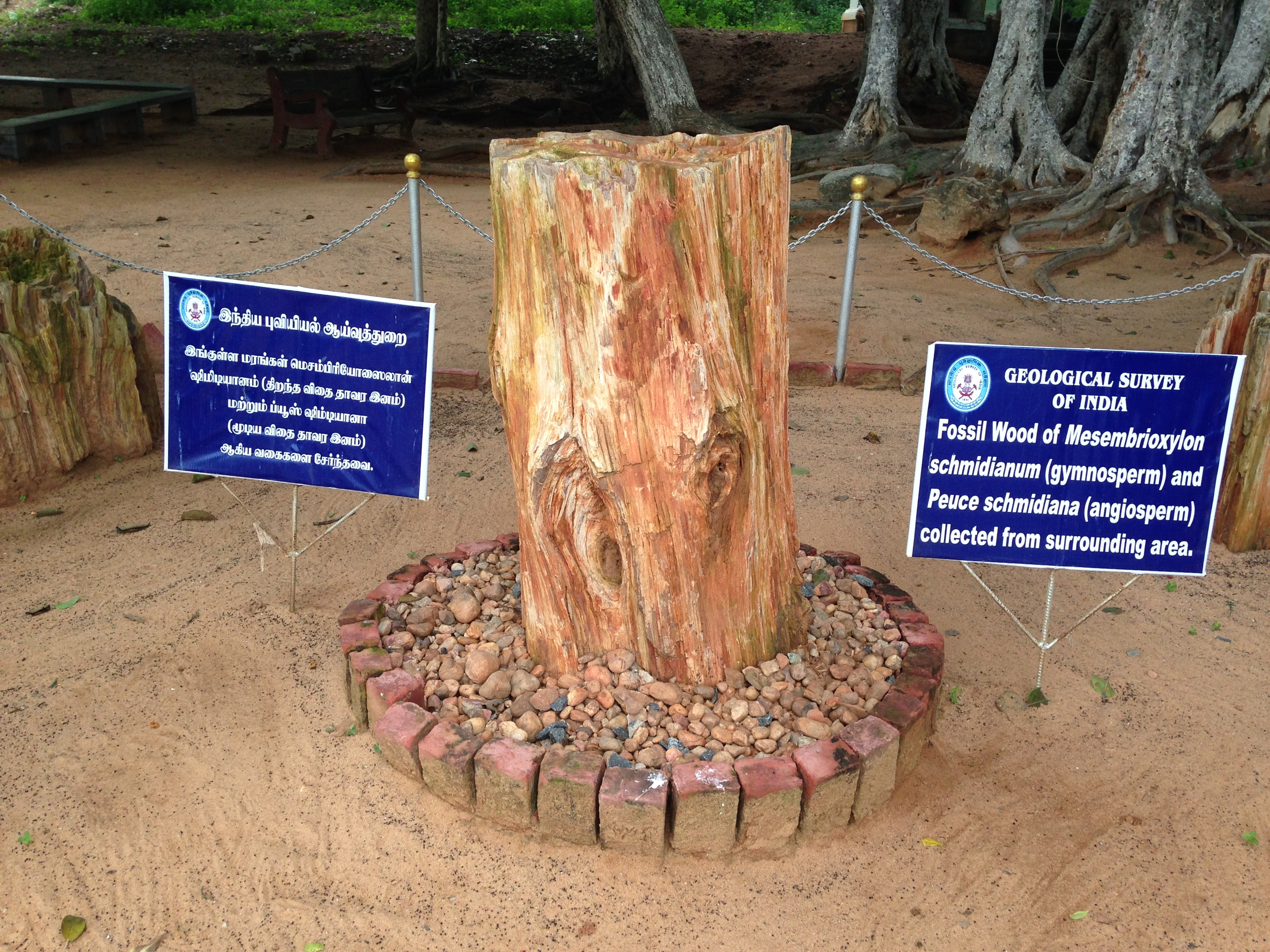
Fossilised wood of Mesembrioxylon schmidianum (gymnosperm) and Peuce schmidianum (angiosperm)

== See also ==
- Ghughua Fossil Park – National Park in Madhya Pradesh, India
- Mandla Plant Fossils National Park – National Park in Madhya Pradesh, India
- National Fossil Wood Park, Sathanur – Fossil park and protected area in Sathanur, India
- Shivalik Fossil Park – Fossil park in Saketi, India
