= Amkhoi Fossil Park =

Fossil park in West Bengal, India

Coordinates: 23°37′23″N 87°35′21″E

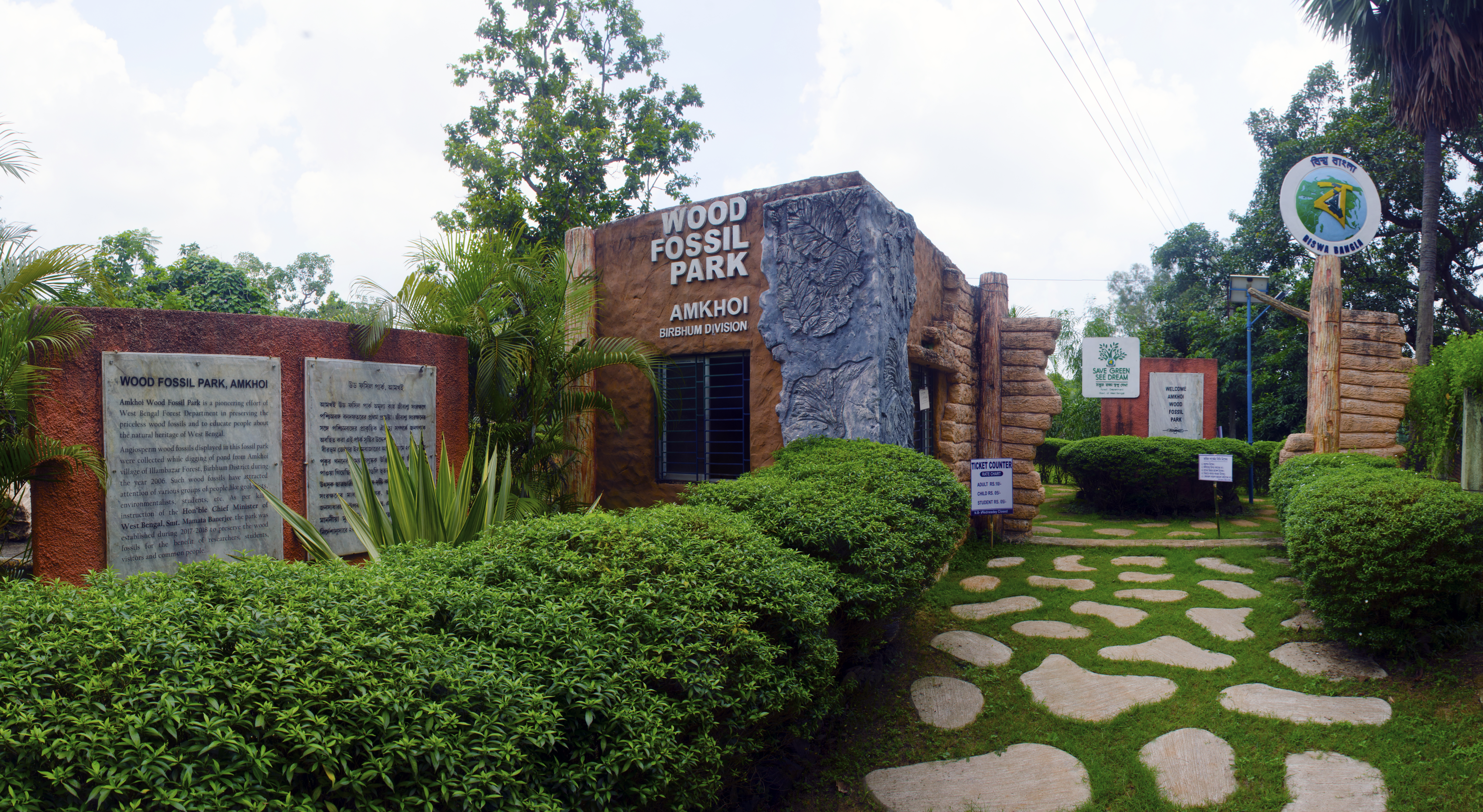
Entrance of Amkhoi Wood Fossil Park

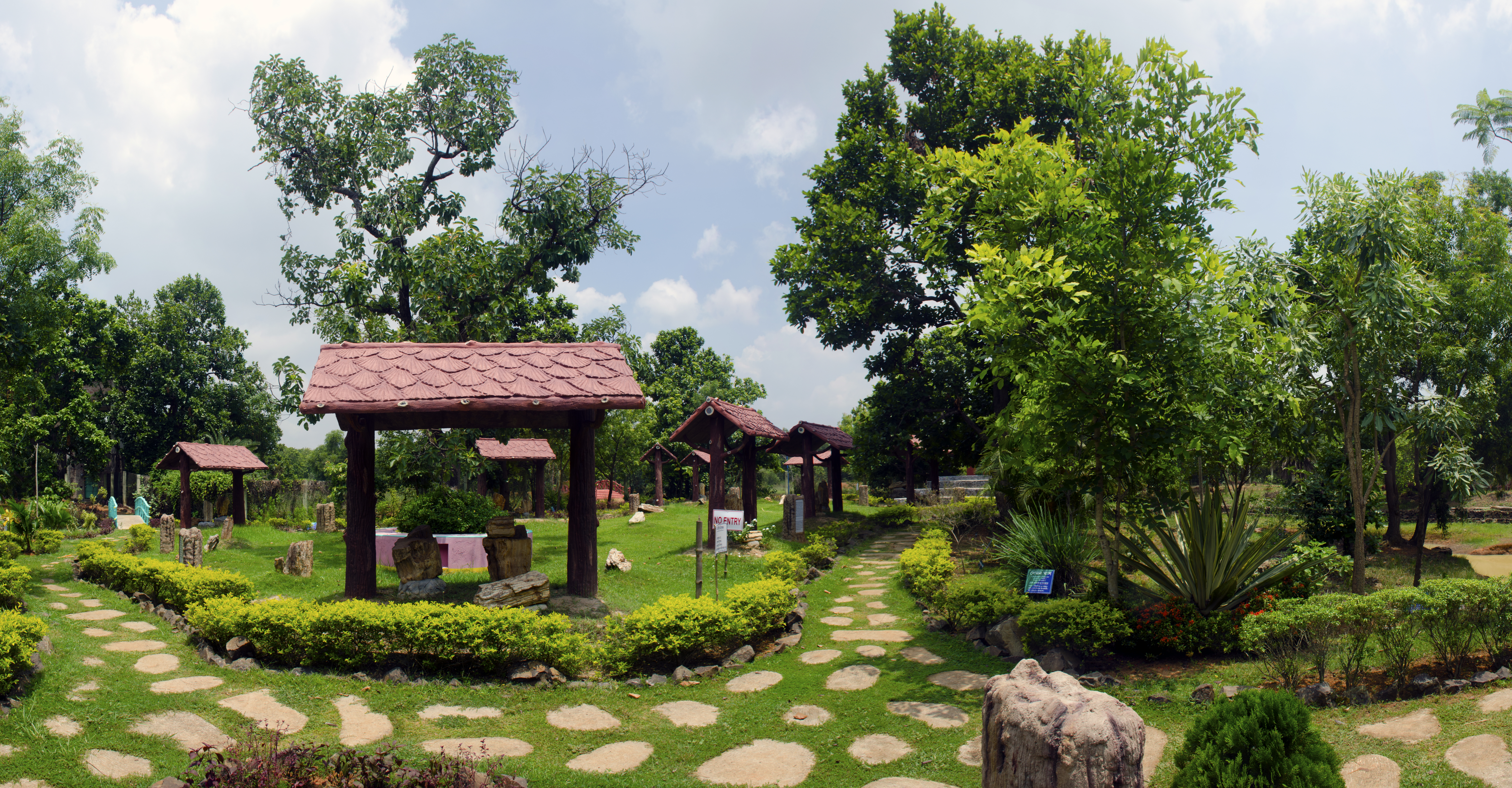
Inside the Amkhoi Wood Fossil Park

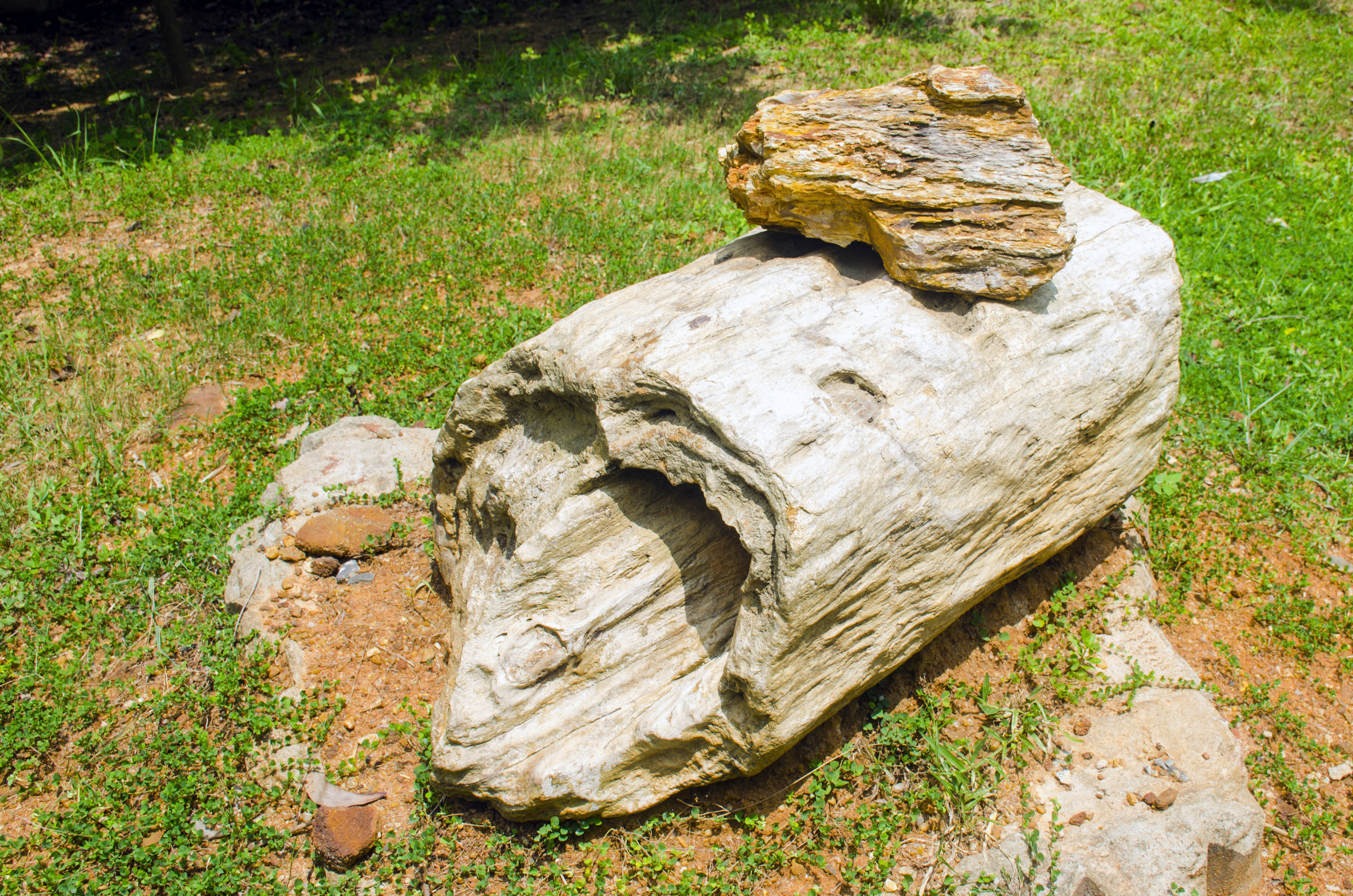
A fossil displayed at Amkhoi Wood Fossil Park

Amkhoi Fossil Park is a fossil park located near Illambazar in the Birbhum District of West Bengal, India. It contains fossilized wood 15 to 20 million years of age and is officially recognized by the State Forest Department of West Bengal. In 2016 while digging a pond the villagers of Amkhoi village, near Ilambazar, found some large bone-like structures. Later it was established that the bone-like structures were actually wood fossils. Fossilized or petrified wood is often considered as semi-precious ‘stones’ and often used in jewellery — fetching a good market value. As the word spread it attracted fossil hunters from far and wide. To prevent the vandalism and theft of fossils the forest department decided to convert the area into a fossil park. In 2017 - 18 the park came into existence and was called Amkhoi Wood Fossil Park. The aim of the park was to create awareness about fossils among students and common people, and also try to help scholars in their research. It is the only fossil park of West Bengal state and has an area of 10 hectares. The fossils are laid out in a manicured lawn surrounded by pathways separated by hedge walls. Bilingual boards narrate the details of not only the fossils, but also about the process of fossilization.

== The fossils ==
The fossils displayed are trunk portions of angiosperm (flowering plants). the trees were originally part of a forest that thrived in the uplands of Rajmahal and Chotanagpur Hills. It is presumed that the trees were carried by floods and deposited under fine sand and clay, gradually transforming them into fossils. The fossils found here belong to Dipterocarpaceae, Anacardiaceae, Combretacea and Leguminosae families of plants.

== Visiting ==
The park is located near Ilambazar and is easily accessible from the tourist spot of Shantiniketan, Bolpur. The park is closed on Wednesday, for other days it is open from 10 am - 4 pm. There is an entrance fee of ₹ 10 and ₹ 5 for students and children.
