= Ghughua Fossil Park =

National Park in Madhya Pradesh, India

- IUCN category II (national park)
- Location within Madhya Pradesh Location within India
- Interactive map of Ghughua Fossil Park
- Location: Madhya Pradesh, India
- Coordinates: 23°6′38″N 80°36′51″E
- Area: 75 acres (0.30 km^{2})
- Created: 1983

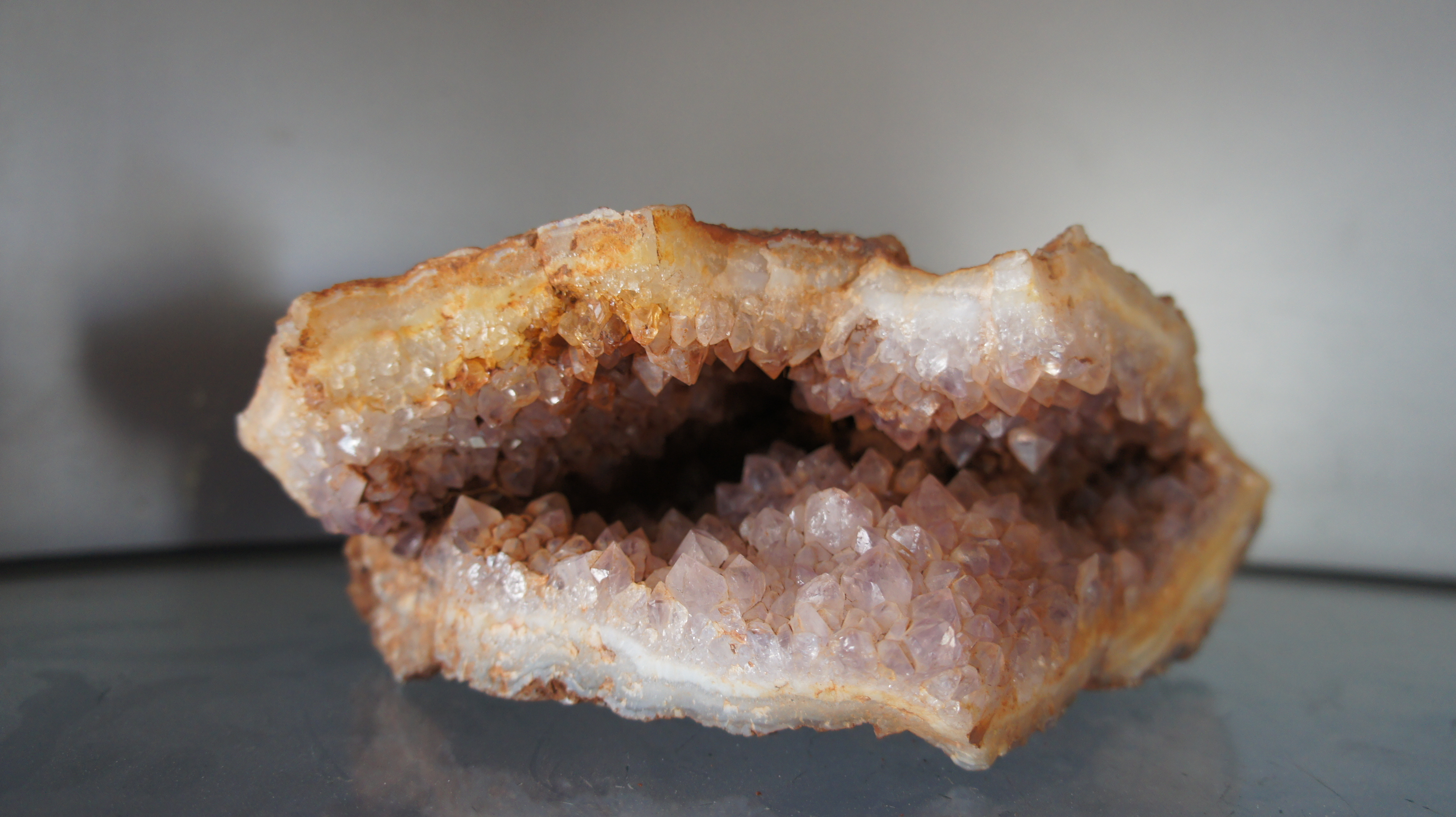
Ghughuwa fossil

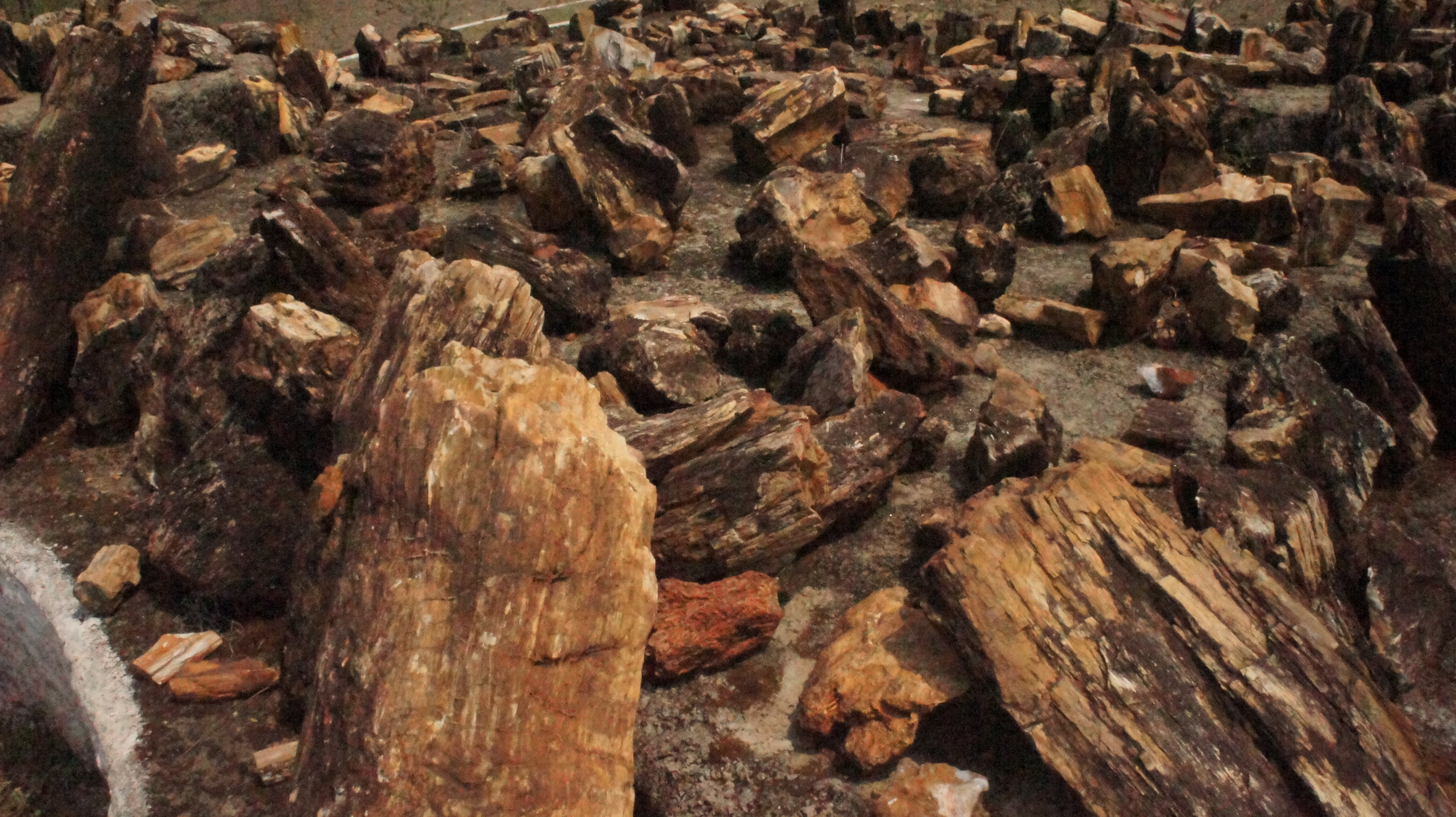
Ghughuwa fossil park

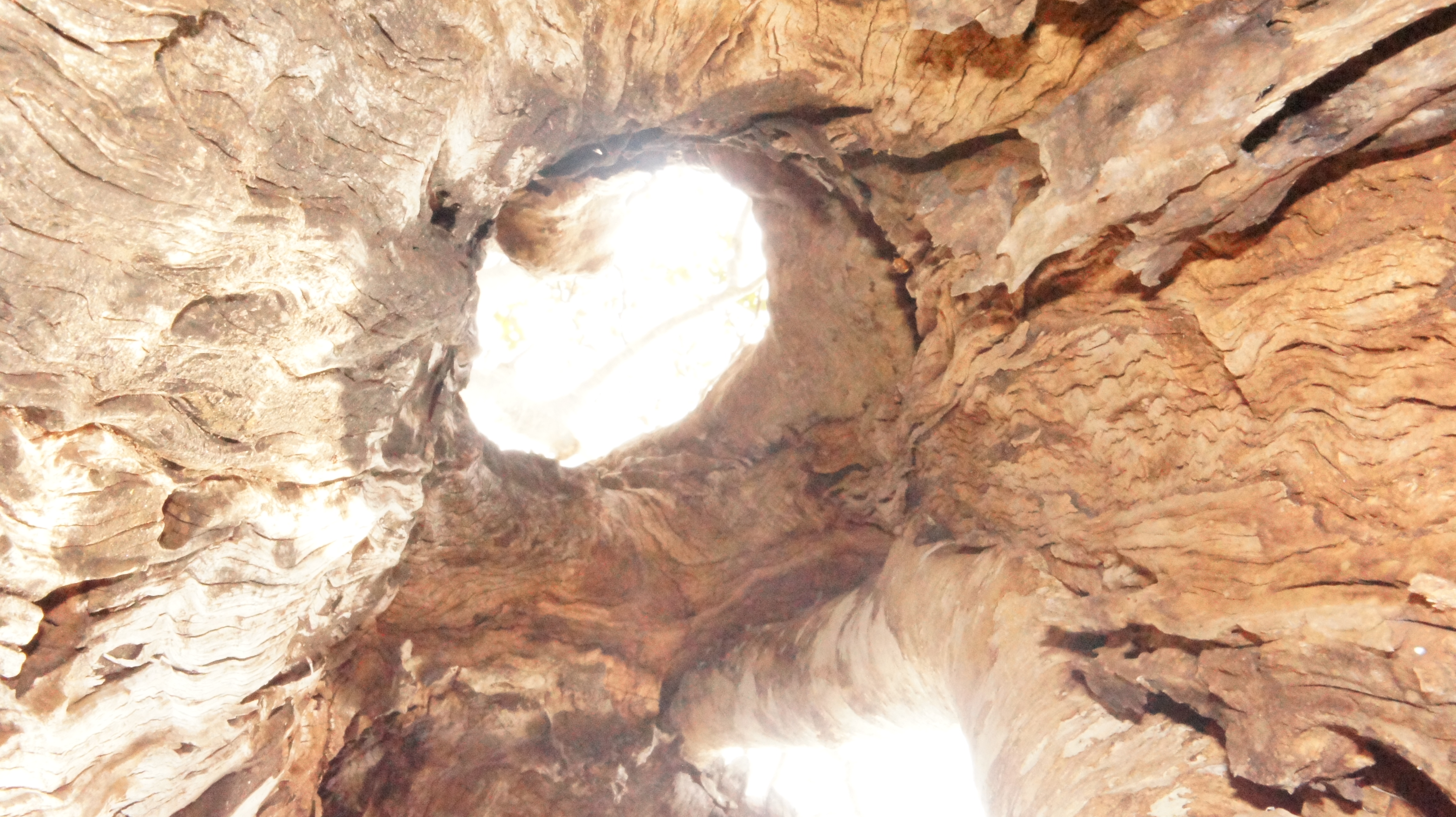
Rock formations at Ghughua Fossil Park

Ghughua Fossil Park is a National Park, located near Shahpura in Madhya Pradesh, India, in which plant fossils belonging to 31 genera of 18 families have been identified.

The site was founded during the 1970s by Dr. Dharmendra Prasad, a statistical officer of the Mandla district and honorary secretary of the district archaeology unit. It was declared a National Park in 1983. Numerous plant, leaf, fruit, seed, and shell fossils can be found in this park, some of which date as far back as 65 million years, the most prominent of which are the palm fossils.

== Notable fossils ==
A fossil wood bearing some similarities to eucalyptus found at Ghughua may be the oldest fossil of its type ever discovered. This find would support a gondwanan paleodistribution. Additional notable discoveries include a dinosaur egg fossil.

== Transportation ==
Ghughua Fossil Park is located near National Highway 11. It is situated 14 km from Shahpura and 76 km from Jabalpur.

== See also ==
- Shivalik Fossil Park
- National Fossil Wood Park, Tiruvakkarai
