= B. coccinea =

B. coccinea is an abbreviated Latin binomial. The specific epithet coccinia derives from the Greek, kokkinia or kokkinias meaning "red" or "scarlet", and the name commonly refers to species with red colouration. It may refer to the following species:

- Banksia coccinea, the scarlet banksia, Waratah banksia or Albany banksia, an erect shrub or small tree species endemic to south west Western Australia
- Begonia coccinea, the scarlet begonia, a shrub native to the Atlantic Forest of Brazil
- Berghesia coccinea, the sole species of the genus Berghesia, which is endemic to Mexico
- Boerhavia coccinea, Tar vine or scarlet spiderling, a pan-tropical herb
- Brownea coccinea, a species of small evergreen tree
