= List of state trees =

List of state trees may refer to:

- List of Indian state trees, for the Indian states
- List of state trees of Venezuela, for the Venezuelan states
- List of U.S. state and territory trees, for the U.S. states.
