= Mountain rose =

Mountain rose may refer to the plants:

- Brownea coccinea
- Kerria japonica
- Metrosideros nervulosa
- Metrosideros sclerocarpa
- Rosa pendulina
