= Brownea enricii =

Conservation status
- Least Concern (IUCN 3.1)

Scientific classification
- Kingdom: Plantae
- Clade: Tracheophytes
- Clade: Angiosperms
- Clade: Eudicots
- Clade: Rosids
- Order: Fabales
- Family: Fabaceae
- Genus: Brownea
- Species: B. enricii

Binomial name
- Brownea enricii Quiñones

Species of plant

Brownea enricii is a tree in the family Fabaceae, native to Colombia. It is named for the Colombian botanist Enrique Forero.

== Description ==
Brownea enricii grows as a tree from 5–20 metres (20–70 ft) tall. The leaves consist of up to 16 pairs of leaflets, with elliptical leaflets measuring up to 16.5 cm (6 in) long. Inflorescences are densely flowered with flowers featuring five red petals. The fruits measure up to 10.5 cm (4 in) long.

== Distribution and habitat ==
Brownea enricii is endemic to Colombia, where it is found in Boyacá, Cundinamarca, Casanare, Caquetá, Meta and Putumayo Departments. Its habitat is in rainforest at altitudes from 70–1,200 m (200–3,900 ft).
