= Peninsular Gneiss =

Geological formations in India

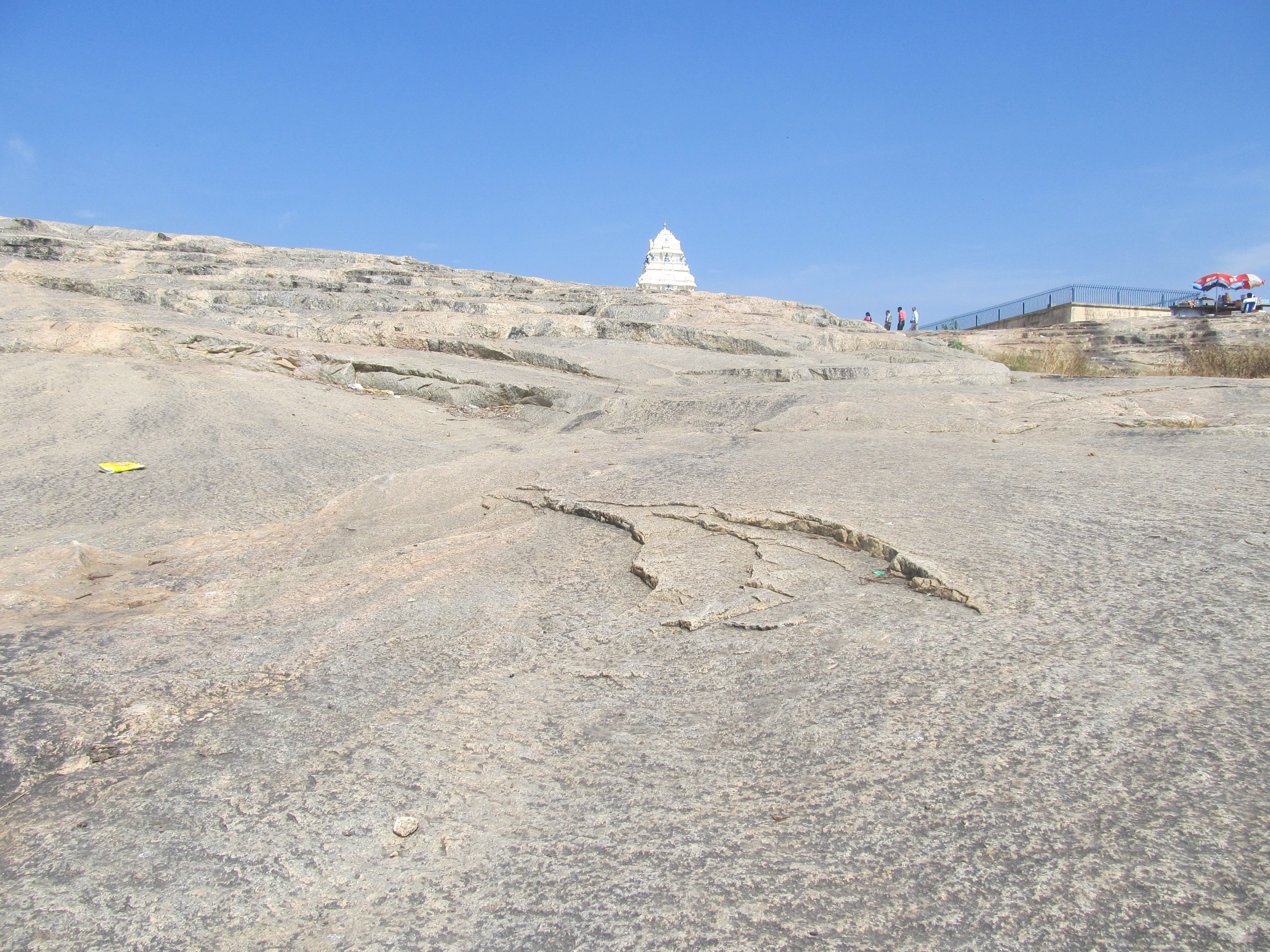
- Peninsular Gneiss at Lal Bagh

- Location within Karnataka
- Type: Geological formation
- Location: Lal Bagh, Bengaluru, India
- Coordinates: 12°56′55″N 77°35′21″E
- Status: Protected area

National Geological Monuments of India
- Official name: Peninsular Gneiss, Lal Bagh
- Designated: 1975
- Designated by: Geological Survey of India

Peninsular Gneiss refers to the extensive gneissic complex of metamorphic rocks found across the Peninsular India. The term was introduced by William Frederick Smeeth of the Mysore Geological Department in 1916 for the ancient gneissic rocks of the region. One of the best exposures is found at Lal Bagh in Bengaluru, which was declared as a National Geological Monument by the Geological Survey of India in 1975.

== Geology ==
Peninsular Gneiss consists of intrusive rocks associated with the Dharwar supracrustal system and metamorphic rocks formed through the granitization of the older Dharwar sedimentary–volcogenic sequence. In most stratigraphic schemes, the peninsular gneisses are shown as the younger Archean strata situated above the Dharwar system. In some geological schemes, however, the supracrustal rocks of the Dharwar group have the Peninsular Gneiss as the basement rock formation. The Peninsular Gneiss was partly formed by the migmatization of pre-existing metasedimentary and meta–igneous rocks, resulting in the formation of the composite gneiss.

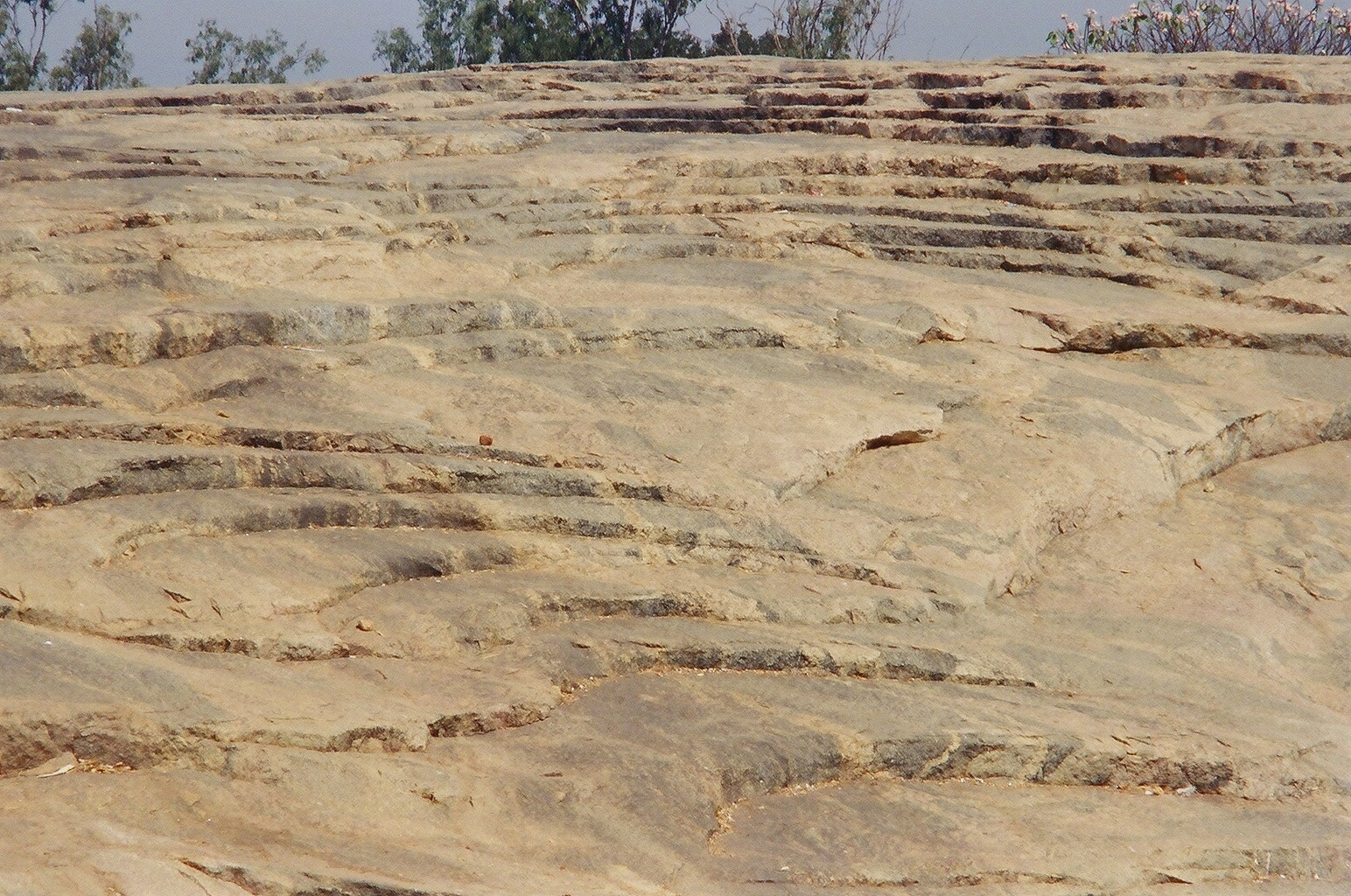
Gneissic exposure at Lal Bagh

Peninsular Gneisses are amongst the oldest geological formations associated with suture zones in the Indian subcontinent. Dating to about 2.5–3.4 billion years, they are thought to have formed during three major episodes, around 3.4 billion years ago, 3.3–3.2 billion years ago, and 3.0–2.9 billion years ago. The age of these rocks make them important for studying the evolution of the Earth's crust.

Peninsular Gneisses consist of polyphase migmatites, gneisses and granites, ranging in composition from granodiorite to tonalite. The Lal Bagh Hill is composed mainly of dark biotite gneiss of granitic to granodioritic composition, with visible streaks of biotite. Older rocks occur as enclaves within the gneiss. A common example is dark grey to black amphibolite, which was transformed into grey biotite gneiss during migmatization. This was later intruded first by grey porphyritic granite and then by pink granite.
