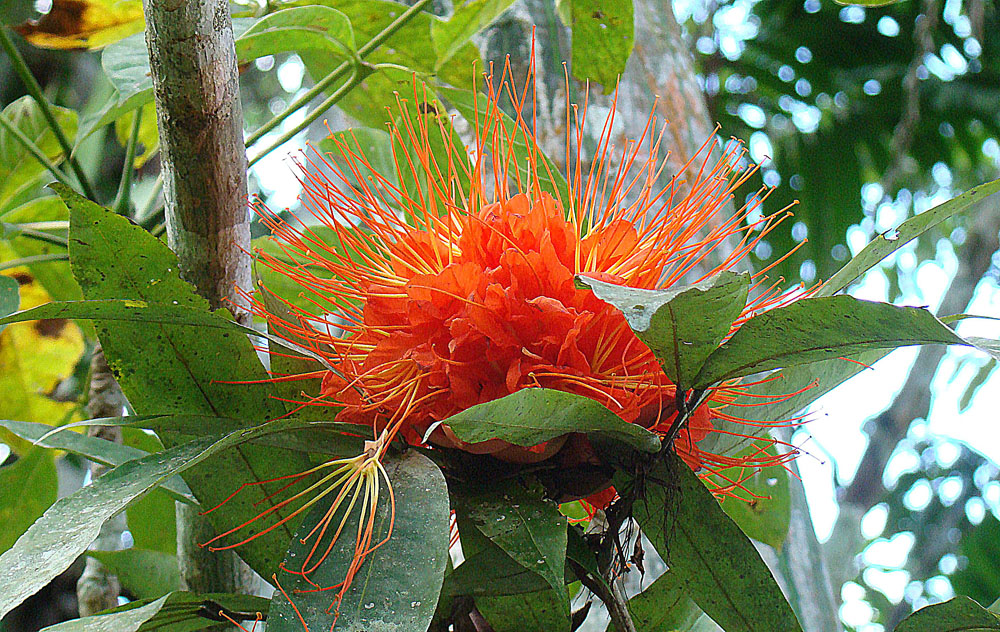
- In the Panama Canal Zone

Scientific classification
- Kingdom: Plantae
- Clade: Tracheophytes
- Clade: Angiosperms
- Clade: Eudicots
- Clade: Rosids
- Order: Fabales
- Family: Fabaceae
- Genus: Brownea
- Species: B. macrophylla

Binomial name
- Brownea macrophylla Linden ex Mast.

Synonyms
- Brownea antioquensis Linden; Brownea macbrideana Standl.

= Brownea macrophylla =

Species of plant

Brownea macrophylla is a tree in the legume family Fabaceae. The specific epithet macrophylla means 'large-leaved'.

== Description ==
Brownea macrophylla grows as a tree up to 7 metres (20 ft) tall, occasionally to 10 m (30 ft). The leaves are pinnate, with up to seven pairs of leaflets and measure up to 25 cm (10 in) long. Inflorescences are densely flowered with flowers featuring orange petals. The legumes are flat and oblong-shaped, measuring up to 20 cm (8 in) long.

== Distribution and habitat ==
Brownea macrophylla is native to Panama, Colombia, Ecuador, Peru and Venezuela. In Colombia, it is found at altitudes up to 1,350 m (4,400 ft). In Panama, its habitat is in tropical forest.
