= Brownea santanderensis =

Conservation status
- Endangered (IUCN 3.1)

Scientific classification
- Kingdom: Plantae
- Clade: Tracheophytes
- Clade: Angiosperms
- Clade: Eudicots
- Clade: Rosids
- Order: Fabales
- Family: Fabaceae
- Genus: Brownea
- Species: B. santanderensis

Binomial name
- Brownea santanderensis Quiñones

Species of plant

Brownea santanderensis is a tree in the family Fabaceae, native to Colombia. It is named for Colombia's Santander Department.

== Description ==
Brownea santanderensis grows as a tree from 4–6 metres (10–20 ft) tall. The leaves consist of up to 4 pairs of leaflets, elliptical and measuring up to 30 cm (12 in) long. Inflorescences feature flowers with five red petals.

== Distribution and habitat ==
Brownea santanderensis is endemic to Colombia, where it is confined to Santander Department. Its habitat is at altitudes from 100–500 m (300–1,600 ft).
