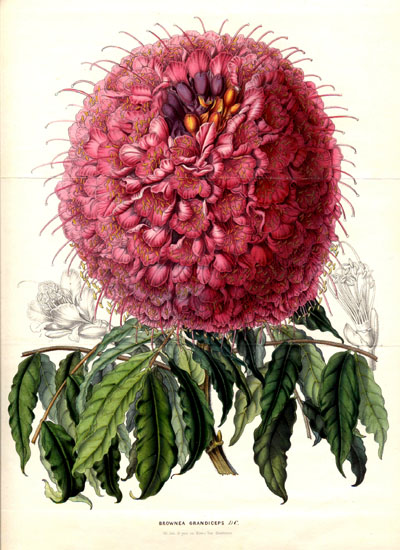
- Illustration from a book by Charles Antoine Lemaire

Conservation status
- Least Concern (IUCN 3.1)

Scientific classification
- Kingdom: Plantae
- Clade: Tracheophytes
- Clade: Angiosperms
- Clade: Eudicots
- Clade: Rosids
- Order: Fabales
- Family: Fabaceae
- Genus: Brownea
- Species: B. grandiceps

Binomial name
- Brownea grandiceps Jacq.

= Brownea grandiceps =

Rose of Venezuela

Species of legume

Brownea grandiceps is a species of tree in the family Fabaceae. Its common names include the rose of Venezuela and the scarlet flame bean. It originated in South America but is now widely grown as a decorative tree in tropical gardens.

== Description ==
The rose of Venezuela is a small, slow-growing tree with stout branches eventually reaching about 6 metres (20 ft). The trunk has greyish-brown, lightly furrowed bark. The shoots and leaf stalks are downy. The leaves are opposite, elongated and pinnate with twelve to eighteen pairs of oblong or lanceolate leaflets ending in a bristle-like point. When they first unfold, the drooping leaves are pale green with tiny pink and cream dots, but as they mature they become brownish-pink and eventually a uniform shade of green. The globular inflorescences contain numerous crimson, red, deep pink or purple tubular flowers, each with projecting stamens and style. The flower heads can be up to 20 centimetres (7.9 in) in diameter and usually dangle below the foliage. The seeds are contained in bunches of long, brown, furry pods.

== Distribution ==
The rose of Venezuela is native to Brazil, Ecuador, Venezuela, Peru and Colombia where it grows in the tropical rainforest. It has a minimum temperature requirement of 55 °F (13 °C) and will thrive both in full sun and in partial shade.

== Ecology ==
The rose of Venezuela flourishes in areas of forest that are seasonally inundated and is often associated with Virola duckei and Inga thibaudiana. Many epiphytic plants and lianas grow among the branches. The flowers of the rose of Venezuela produce copious amounts of nectar and are attractive to humming birds and butterflies. At night it has been observed that the leaves rise and expose the flowers to the dew, sinking again in the morning to protect the flowers from the sun.
