= List of state trees of Venezuela =

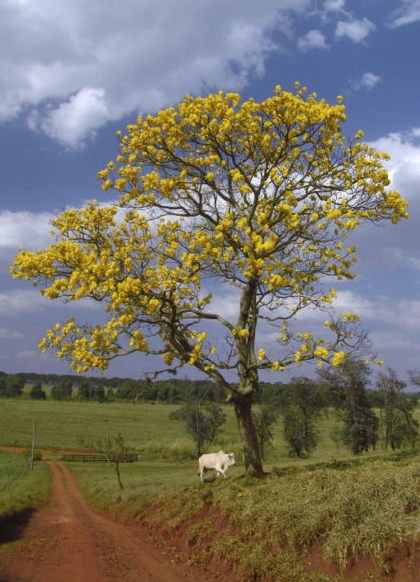
The araguaney (Handroanthus chrysanthus), Venezuela's national tree.

Below is a list of trees that symbolise Venezuela and each state of the country:

== National Tree ==
The National Tree of Venezuela is the Araguaney (Handroanthus chrysanthus).

== State trees ==
State	Local name	Binomial name
Amazonas	Caucho	Hevea benthamiana
Anzoátegui	Cereipo, or Guatamare	Myrospermum frutescens
Apure	Merecure	Moquilea pyrifolia
Aragua	Samán	Albizia saman
Barinas	Cedro	Cedrela odorata
Bolívar	Sarrapia	Dipteryx odorata
Carabobo	Camoruco	Sterculia apetala
Cojedes	Apamate	Tabebuia rosea
Delta Amacuro	Mangle rojo	Rhizophora mangle
Falcón	Cují Yaque	Prosopis juliflora
Guárico	Palma Llanera	Copernicia tectorum
Lara	Semeruco	Malpighia glabra
Mérida	Bucare ceibo	Erythrina poeppigiana
Miranda	Roso Blanco	Brownea leucantha
Monagas	Palma de Moriche	Mauritia flexuosa
Nueva Esparta	Guayacán	Guaiacum officinale
Portuguesa	Caoba	Swietenia macrophylla
Sucre	Roble	Platymiscium diadelphum
Táchira	Pino criollo, or Pino laso	Prumnopitys montana
Trujillo	Bucare anauco, or Reinoso	Erythrina fusca
Vargas	Uva de Playa	Coccoloba uvifera
Yaracuy	Chaguaramo	Roystonea oleracea
Zulia	Cocotero	Cocos nucifera

== See also ==
- National Symbols of Venezuela
