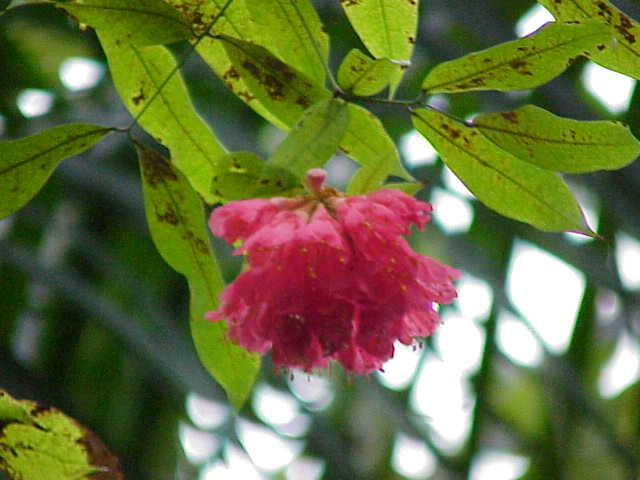
- Brownea ariza

Scientific classification
- Kingdom: Plantae
- Clade: Embryophytes
- Clade: Tracheophytes
- Clade: Spermatophytes
- Clade: Angiosperms
- Clade: Eudicots
- Clade: Rosids
- Order: Fabales
- Family: Fabaceae
- Subfamily: Detarioideae
- Tribe: Amherstieae
- Genus: Brownea; Jacq. (1760), nom. cons.

Species
- 22; see text

Synonyms
- Brownaea Jacq.; Hermesias Loefl. (1758)

= Brownea =

Genus of legumes

Brownea is a genus of flowering plants in the pea family (Fabaceae), subfamily Detarioideae. The genus includes about 22 species native to tropical regions of the Americas. The species are shrubs and trees growing to 20 m tall. Species range from Honduras through southern Central America and northern South America to Peru and northern Brazil, and to Trinidad and Tobago and the Windward Islands in the Caribbean. Species are typically understorey trees or shrubs in lowland tropical rain forest.

Species

22 species are accepted:

- Brownea angustiflora Little
- Brownea ariza Benth.
- Brownea birschellii Hook.f.
- Brownea bolivarensis Pittier
- Brownea chocoana Quiñones
- Brownea coccinea Jacq.
- Brownea enricii Quiñones
- Brownea gladisrojasiae D.Velásquez & G.Agostini
- Brownea grandiceps Jacq.
- Brownea hermesias Mutis
- Brownea jaramilloi Á.J.Pérez & Klitg.
- Brownea leucantha Jacq.
- Brownea longipedicellata Huber
- Brownea macrophylla Linden ex Mast.
- Brownea multijuga Britton & Killip
- Brownea negrensis Benth.
- Brownea puberula Little
- Brownea rosa-de-monte P.J.Bergius
- Brownea santanderensis Quiñones
- Brownea similis R.S.Cowan
- Brownea stenantha Britton & Killip
- Brownea tillettiana D.Velásquez & G.Agostini
