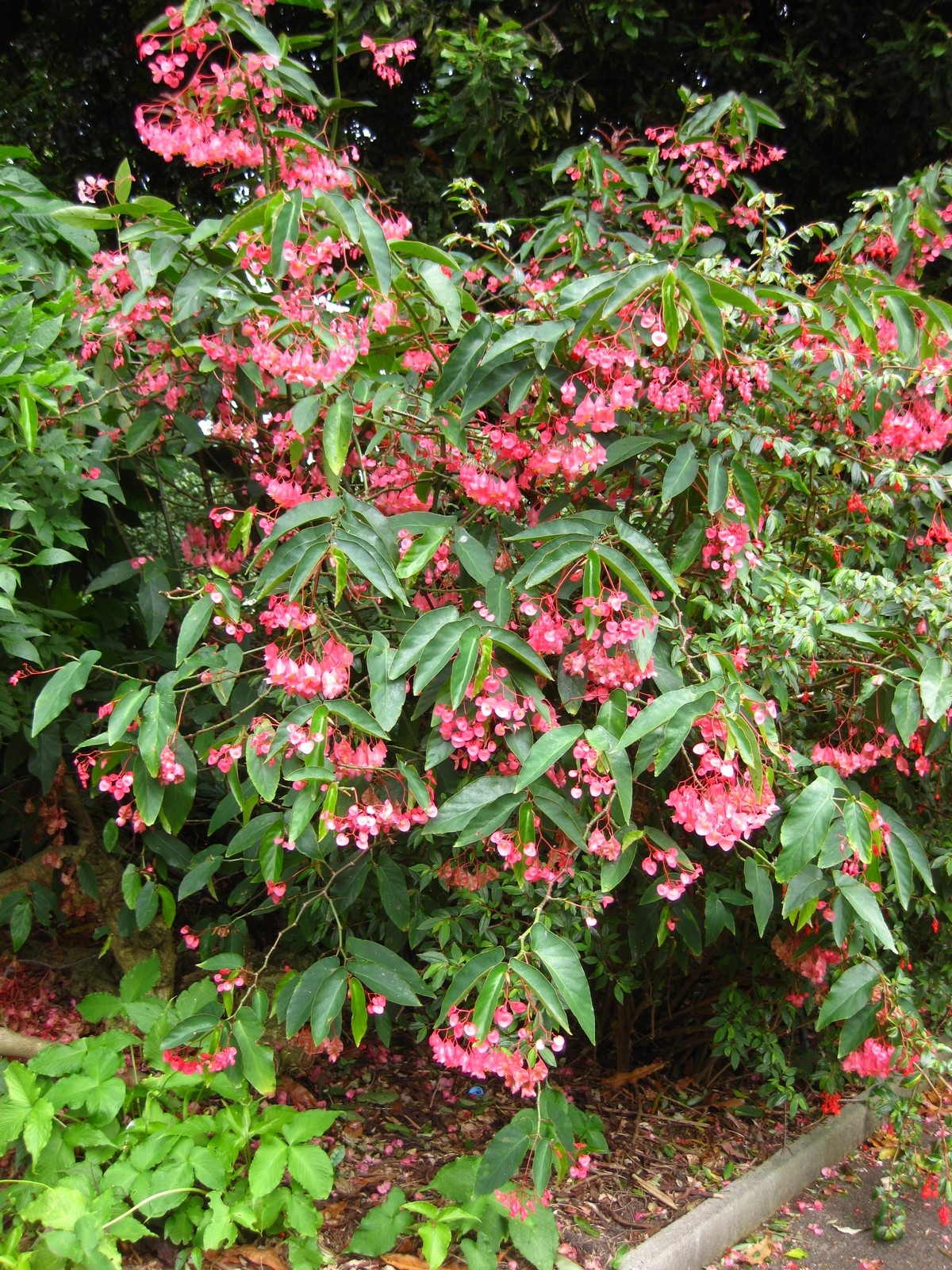

Scientific classification
- Kingdom: Plantae
- Clade: Tracheophytes
- Clade: Angiosperms
- Clade: Eudicots
- Clade: Rosids
- Order: Cucurbitales
- Family: Begoniaceae
- Genus: Begonia
- Species: B. coccinea

Binomial name
- Begonia coccinea Hook.

= Begonia coccinea =

Species of flowering plant

Begonia coccinea, the scarlet begonia, is a species of plant in the family Begoniaceae. It is native to the Atlantic Forest of Brazil.

== Conservation ==
The species is found on the IUCN Red List of endangered species in the Brazilian state of Espírito Santo, in the southeast of Brazil.
