= Enrique Forero =

Colombian botanist (1942–2023)

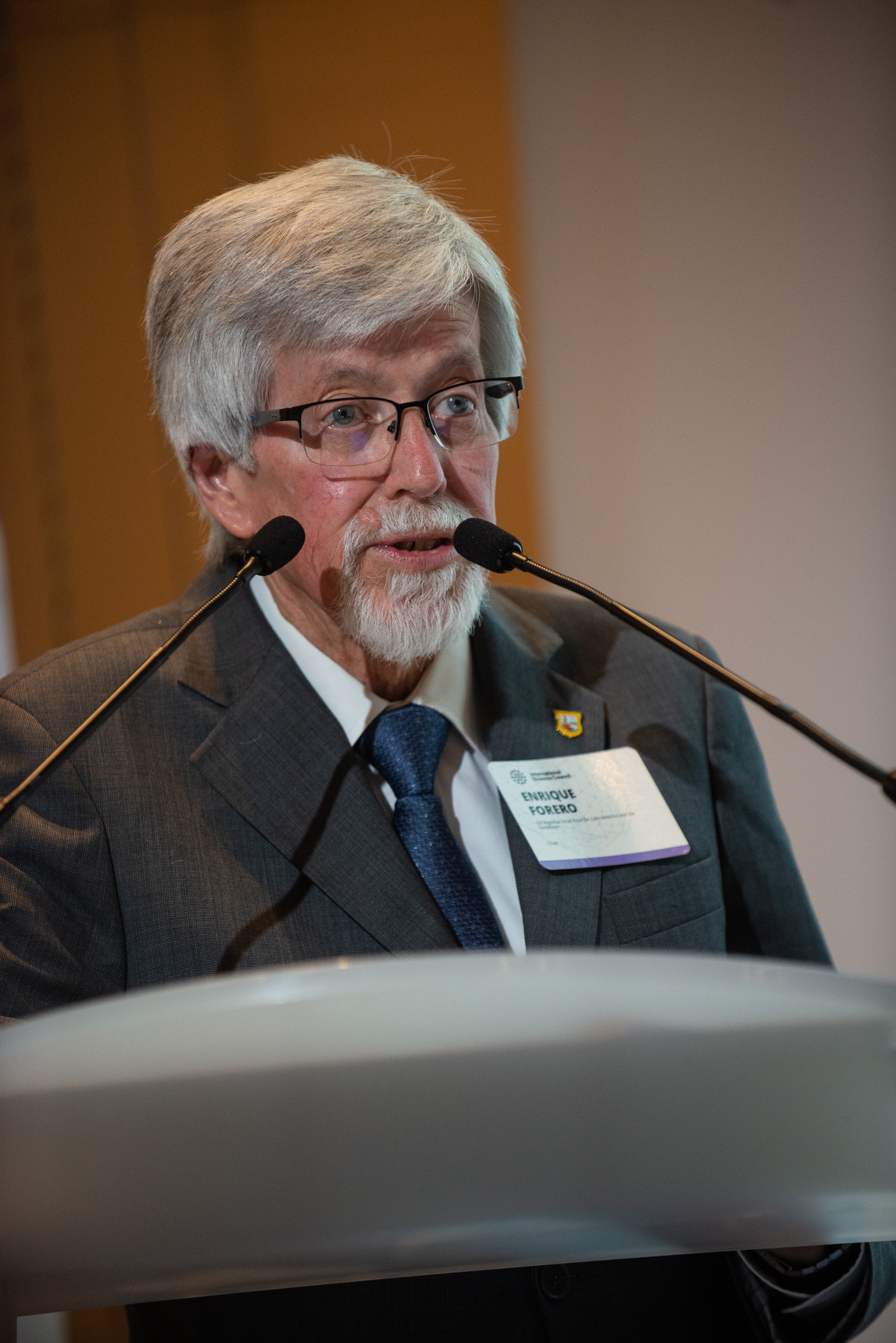
- Forero speaking in 2023
- Born: 7 December 1942
- Died: 5 September 2023 (aged 80)
- Alma mater: National University of Colombia
- Occupation: Botanist, university teacher, naturalist, biologist
- Employer: Missouri Botanical Garden; National University of Colombia
- Awards: Guggenheim Fellowship

Enrique Forero González (7 December 1942 – 5 September 2023) was a Colombian botanist. He died on 5 September 2023, at the age of 80.

== Career and contributions ==
Forero had an extensive career in botanical research and academic leadership. He began his career at the National University of Colombia, where he served as head of the Botany Section (1972–1977) and head Curator of the National Herbarium of Colombia (1972). He later became the first director of the university's graduate program in systematics (1981–1984).

His international career included significant positions at major botanical institutions in the United States. He served as director of research at the Missouri Botanical Garden (1986–1991) and later as Director of the Institute of Systematic Botany at the New York Botanical Garden (1992–1995). Upon returning to Colombia, he became Director of the Institute of Natural Sciences (1996) and Dean of the Faculty of Sciences at National University of Colombia (1996–2000).

From 2013 to 2022, Forero served as President of the Colombian Academy of Exact, Physical, and Natural Sciences (ACCEFYN). His research focused particularly on plant families such as Connaraceae and Fabaceae.

== Professional associations and leadership ==
Forero was instrumental in establishing several key botanical organisations. He participated in founding the Asociación Colombiana de Herbarios, the Asociación Latinoamericana de Botánica, and served on the Scientific Committee of the Red Latinoamericana de Botánica. He served two terms as President of the Asociación Latinoamericana de Botánica (1986–1990, 1998–2002).

He was active in international conservation efforts, participating in the International Union for Conservation of Nature (IUCN), the IUCN-WWF Plants Advisory Group, and the Convention on International Trade in Endangered Species of Wild Fauna and Flora (CITES). While leading ACCEFYN, he also served as president of the Colegio Máximo de las Academias de Colombia (2015–2017).

In May 2022, he was appointed to several prestigious positions, including membership in the council of the United Nations University, chair of the Regional Focal Point for the Latin American and Caribbean Region, and membership in the ISC Committee for Freedom and Responsibility in Science.

== Legacy ==
Forero's contributions to botany and science in Colombia have been recognised through various honours, including the naming of several species after him. In 2023, three new lichen species were named in his memory: Lobariella foreroana, Sticta henrici, and Yoshimuriella enfogoa. His work influenced botanical research, plant conservation, and science policy in Colombia, and he played a crucial role in mentoring new generations of researchers.
