= Berghesia =

Scientific classification
- Kingdom: Plantae
- Clade: Tracheophytes
- Clade: Angiosperms
- Clade: Eudicots
- Clade: Asterids
- Order: Gentianales
- Family: Rubiaceae
- Genus: Berghesia; Nees
- Species: B. coccinea

Binomial name
- Berghesia coccinea Nees

Species of plant

Berghesia is a monospecific genus of flowering plants in the family Rubiaceae. It was described by Christian Gottfried Daniel Nees von Esenbeck in 1847. The genus contains only one species, viz. Berghesia coccinea, which is endemic to Mexico.
