= Brownea rosa-de-monte =

Conservation status
- Least Concern (IUCN 3.1)

Scientific classification
- Kingdom: Plantae
- Clade: Tracheophytes
- Clade: Angiosperms
- Clade: Eudicots
- Clade: Rosids
- Order: Fabales
- Family: Fabaceae
- Genus: Brownea
- Species: B. rosa-de-monte

Binomial name
- Brownea rosa-de-monte P.J.Bergius

Synonyms
- Brownea coccinea Loefl. ex Griseb.; Brownea rosa Pers.; Brownea rosea Otto; Brownea speciosa Rchb. ex DC.; Hermesias speciosa (Rchb. ex DC.) Kuntze

Species of plant

Brownea rosa-de-monte is a tree in the family Fabaceae, native to Central America and Colombia. Its flowers may bloom for a duration of just one night.

== Distribution and habitat ==
Brownea rosa-de-monte is native to Costa Rica, Nicaragua, Panama and Colombia. Its habitat is in rainforest. In Colombia, it is found at altitudes from sea level to 1,100 m (3,600 ft).
