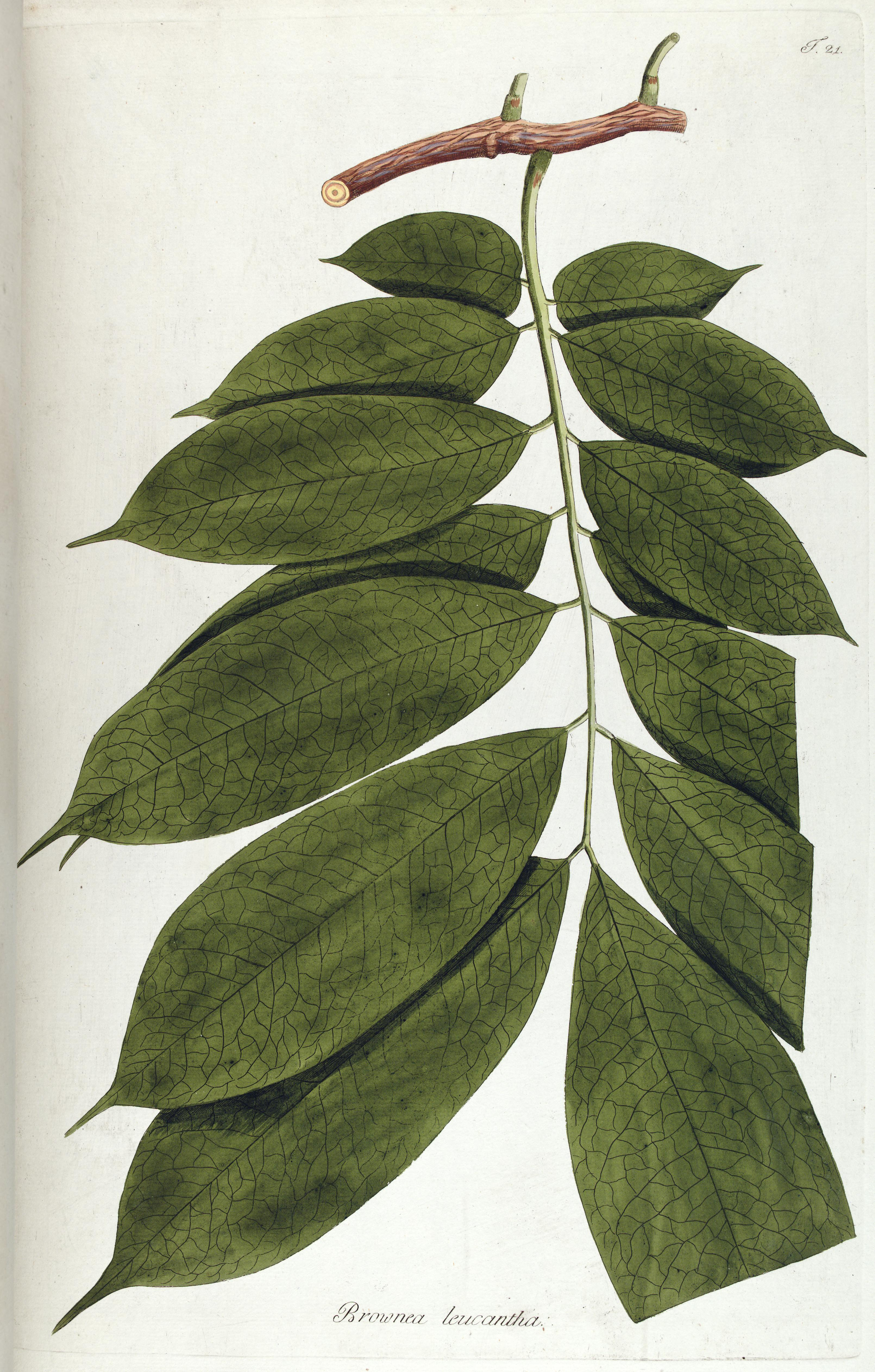
- Botanical illustration

Scientific classification
- Kingdom: Plantae
- Clade: Tracheophytes
- Clade: Angiosperms
- Clade: Eudicots
- Clade: Rosids
- Order: Fabales
- Family: Fabaceae
- Genus: Brownea
- Species: B. leucantha

Binomial name
- Brownea leucantha Jacq.

Synonyms
- Hermesias leucantha Kuntze

= Brownea leucantha =

Species of plant in the genus Brownea

Brownea leucantha, called roso blanco, is a species of flowering plant in the genus Brownea, native to Peru and Venezuela. It is the emblematic state tree of Miranda, Venezuela. It can be distinguished from other members of its genus by its white flowers.
