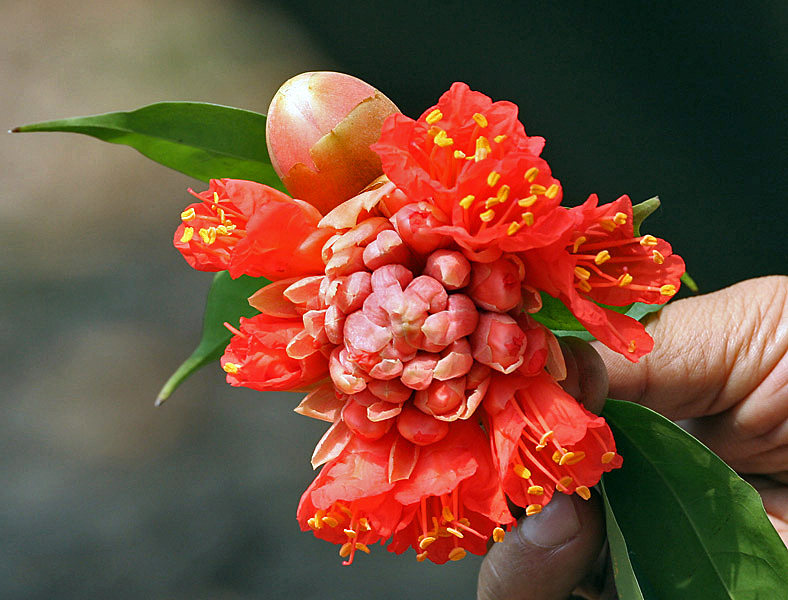
- Flower & its bud in Kolkata, West Bengal, India.

Conservation status
- Least Concern (IUCN 3.1)

Scientific classification
- Kingdom: Plantae
- Clade: Embryophytes
- Clade: Tracheophytes
- Clade: Spermatophytes
- Clade: Angiosperms
- Clade: Eudicots
- Clade: Rosids
- Order: Fabales
- Family: Fabaceae
- Genus: Brownea
- Species: B. coccinea

Binomial name
- Brownea coccinea Jacq.

Synonyms
- Brownea capitella Jacq.; Brownea latifolia Jacq.

= Brownea coccinea =

Species of legume

Brownea coccinea is a species of small evergreen tree with compound leaves and clusters of bright scarlet flowers in the subfamily Detarioideae of the family Fabaceae. Common names include scarlet flame bean, mountain rose, rose of Venezuela and cooper hoop. The species is native to Colombia, Ecuador and Venezuela.

Brownea coccinea, is a small to mid-sized tree with slender branches and a rounded crown and reaches a height of about 12 ft . Brownea coccinea trees have compound leaves which are 10–35 cm. long, containing 4-10 leaflets. Leaflets are oblong or elliptic, pointed at the apex and 4–23 cm. long and 1.5-6.5 cm. wide and smooth. Flowers are tubular with orange-scarlet calyx and petals and 10-12 protruding stamens in heads 7–9 cm. wide surrounded by downy red bracts and in clusters of 2–3 on branches are trunks. Seed pods are brown and 12–24 cm. long, 4 cm. wide and contain 4-10 flat seeds.

== Medicinal uses ==
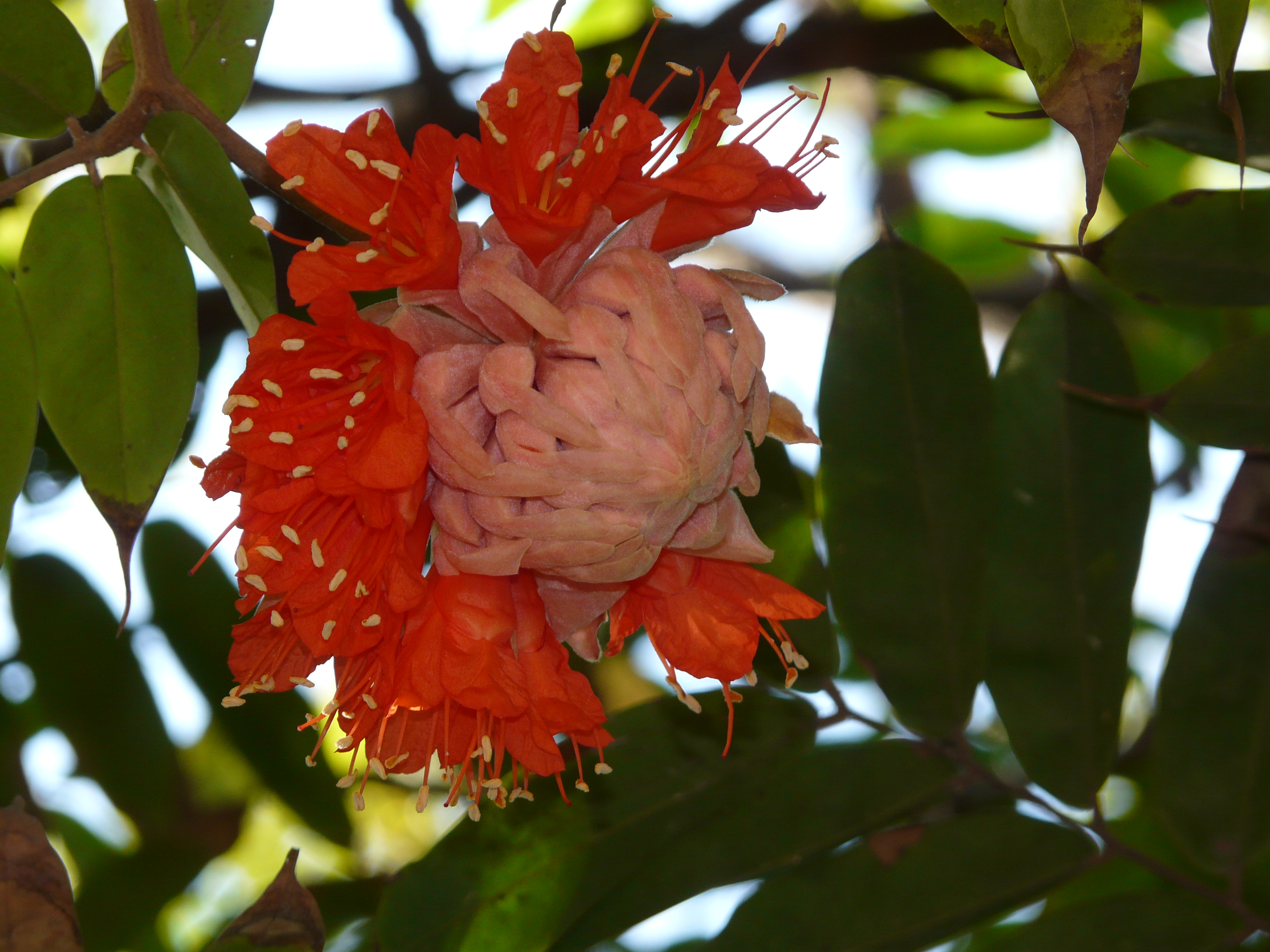
Brownea Coccinea

In Trinidad, infusions of the flowers are consumed as a remedy for colds and coughs. The fresh bark of the tree is used as an anti-hemorrhagic and applied to wounds. Other uses for the plant are as an emmenagogue to stimulate blood flow to the pelvic area and uterus in order to stimulate menstruation, and as an abortifacient. It is commonly used to treat gynecological disorders such as dysmenorrhea and menorrhagia.
