= Tirupati =

City in Andhra Pradesh, India

Tirupati Tirupatī (Telugu)
- City
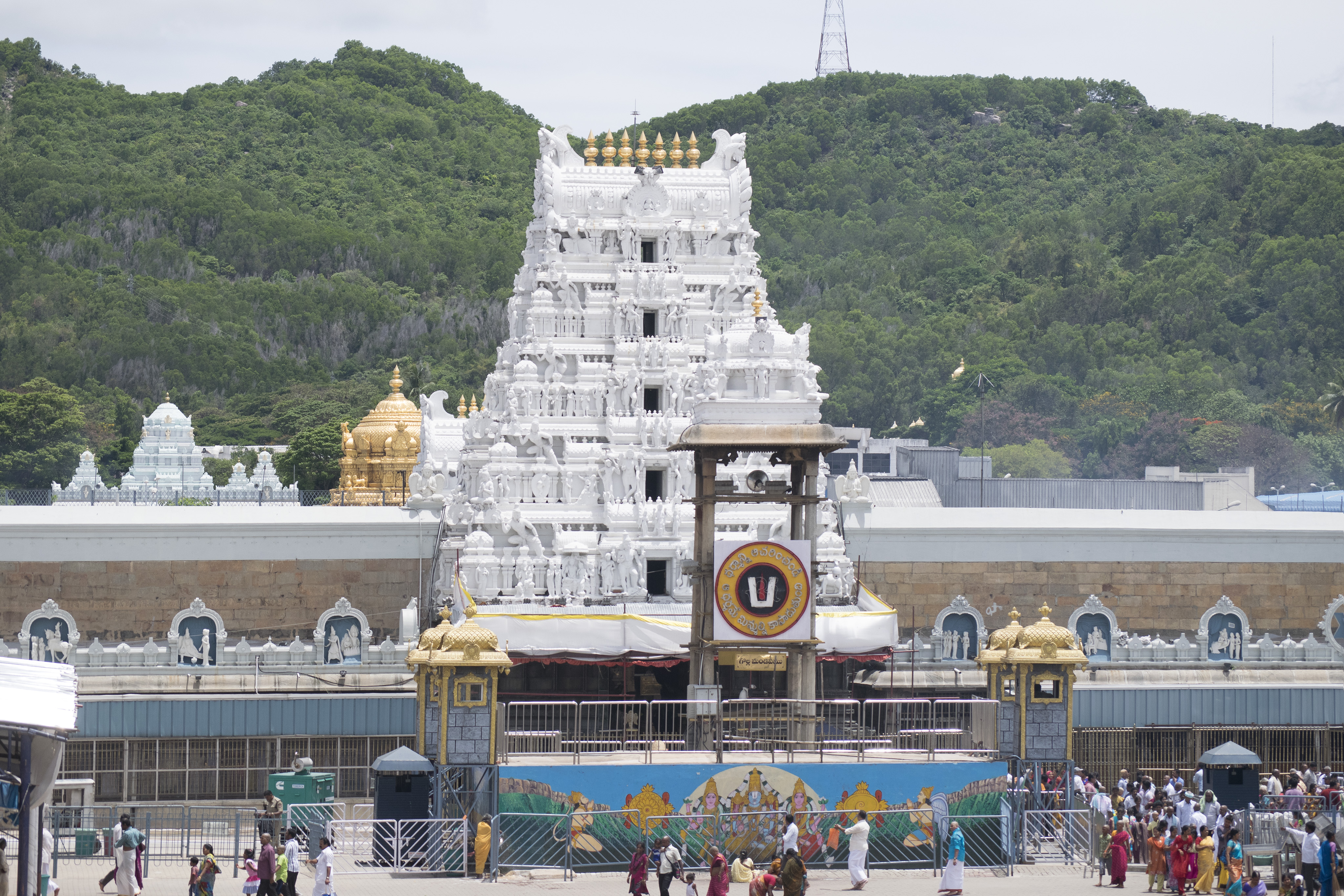
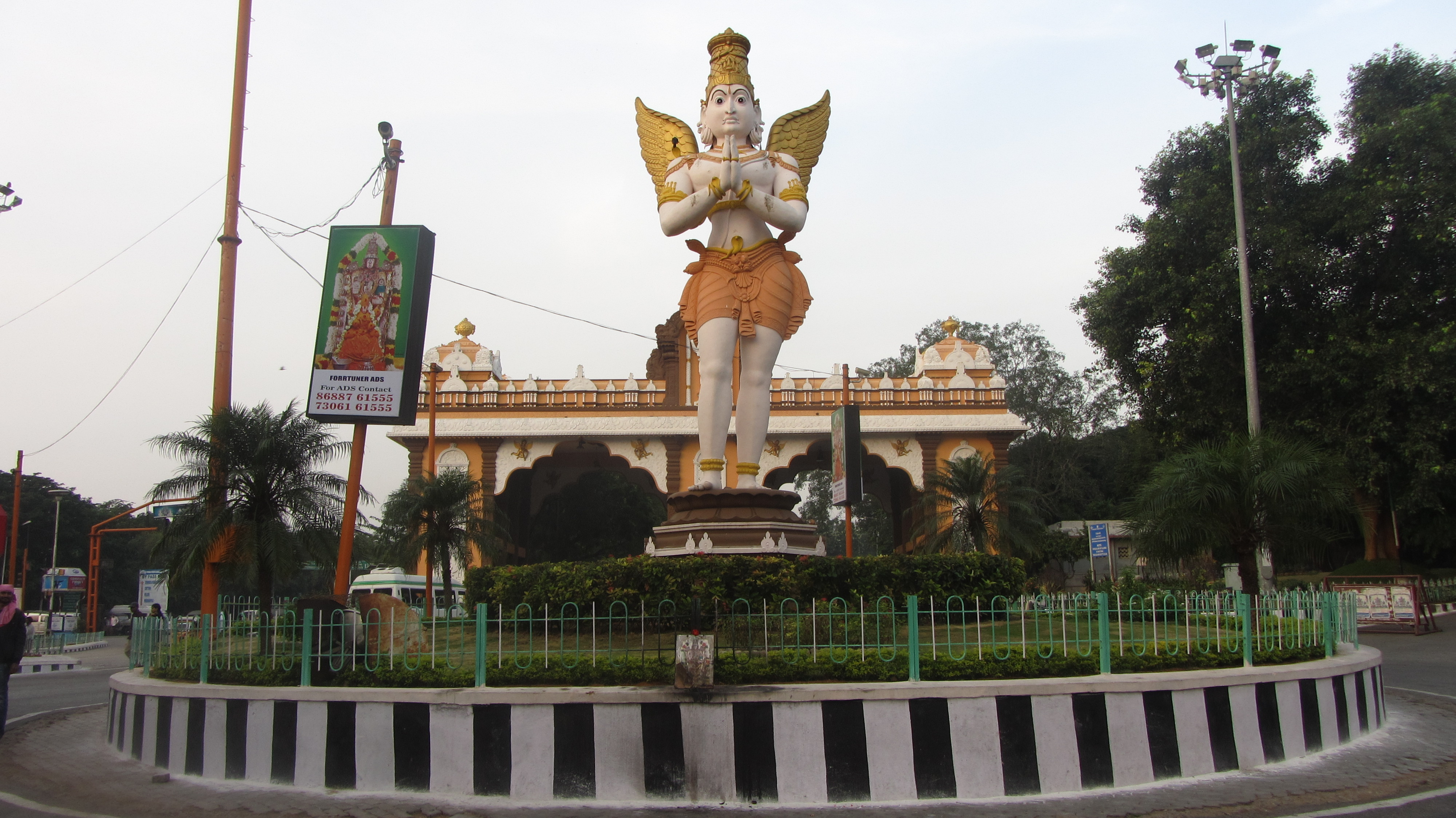
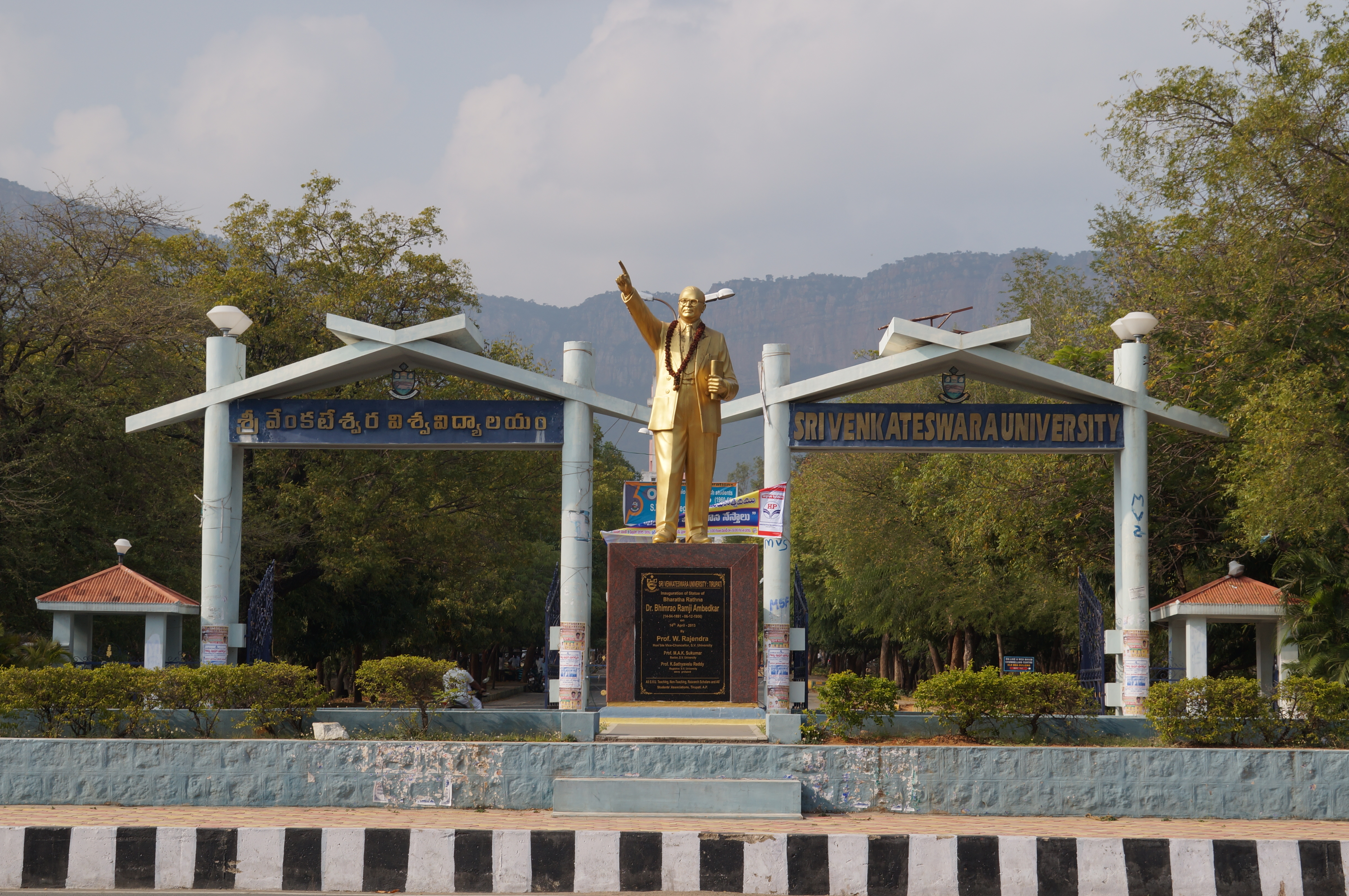
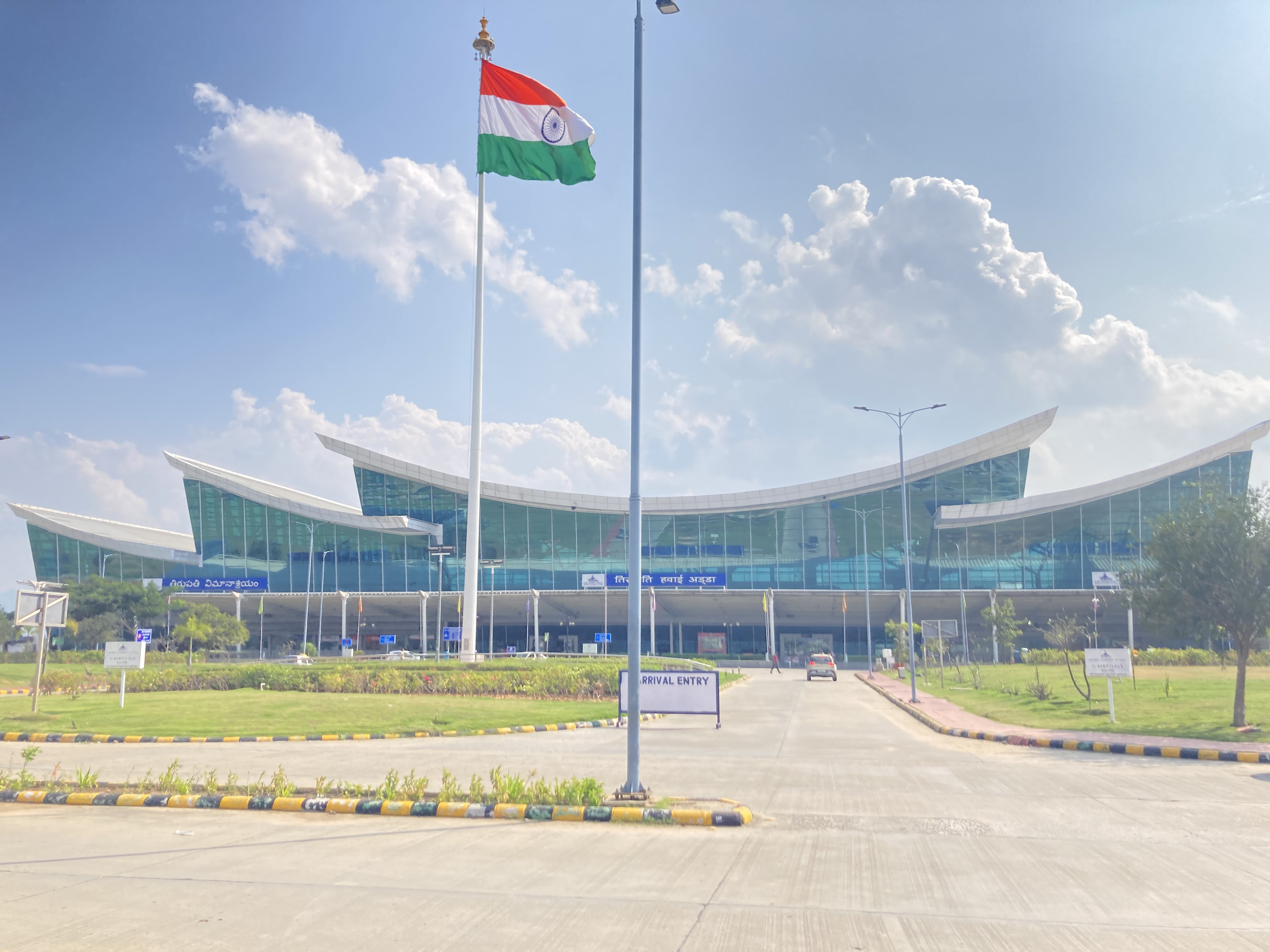
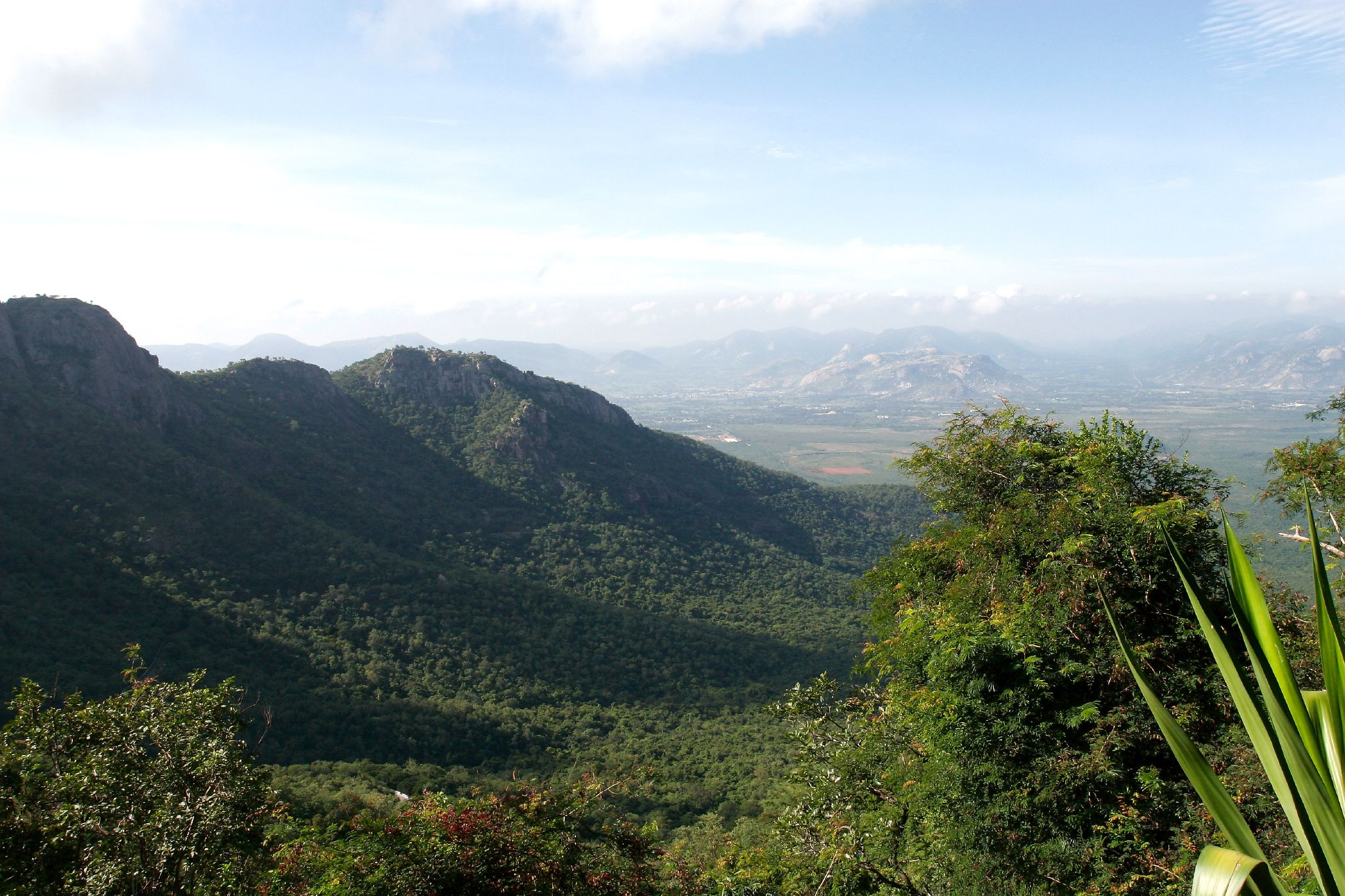
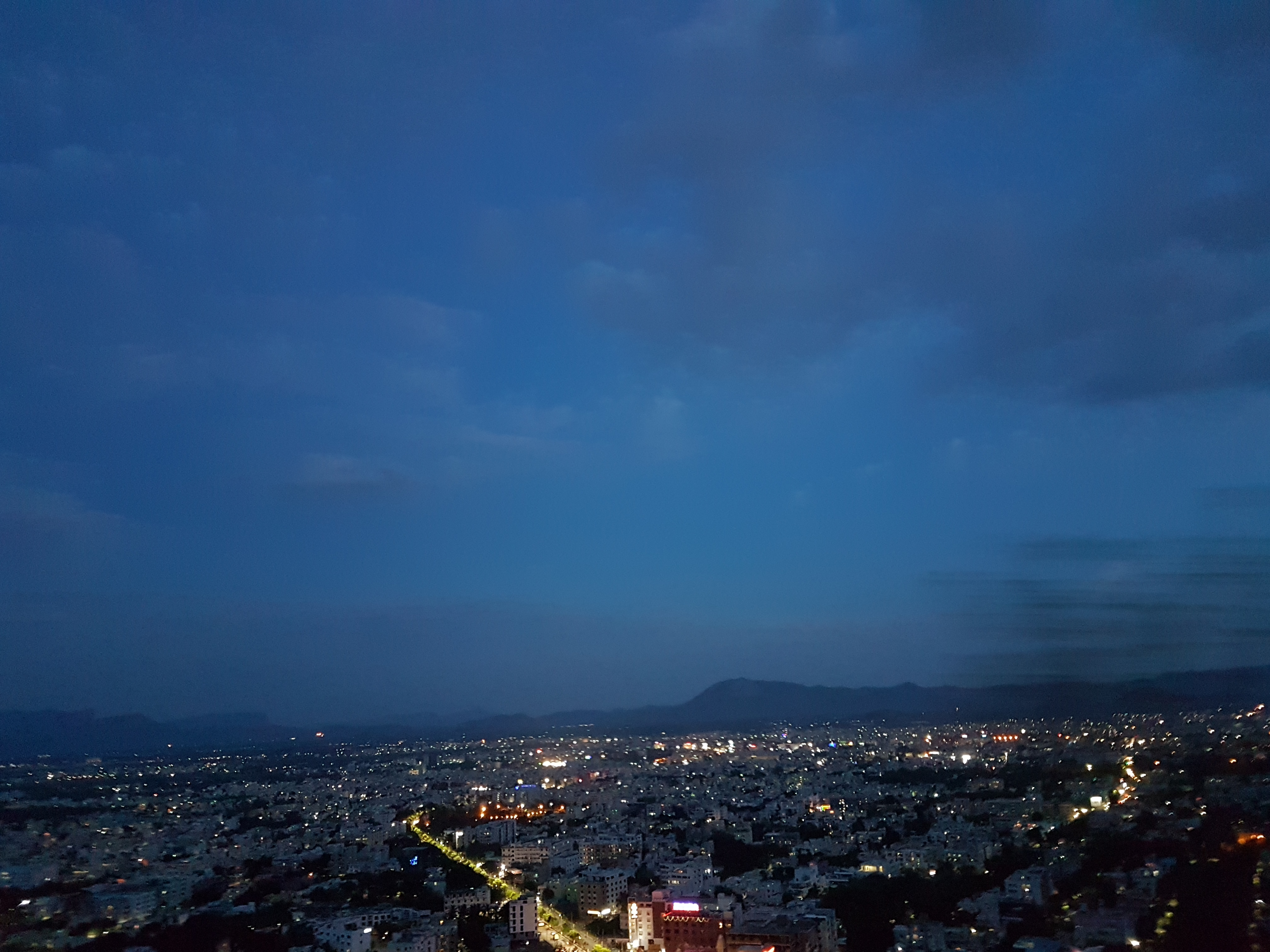
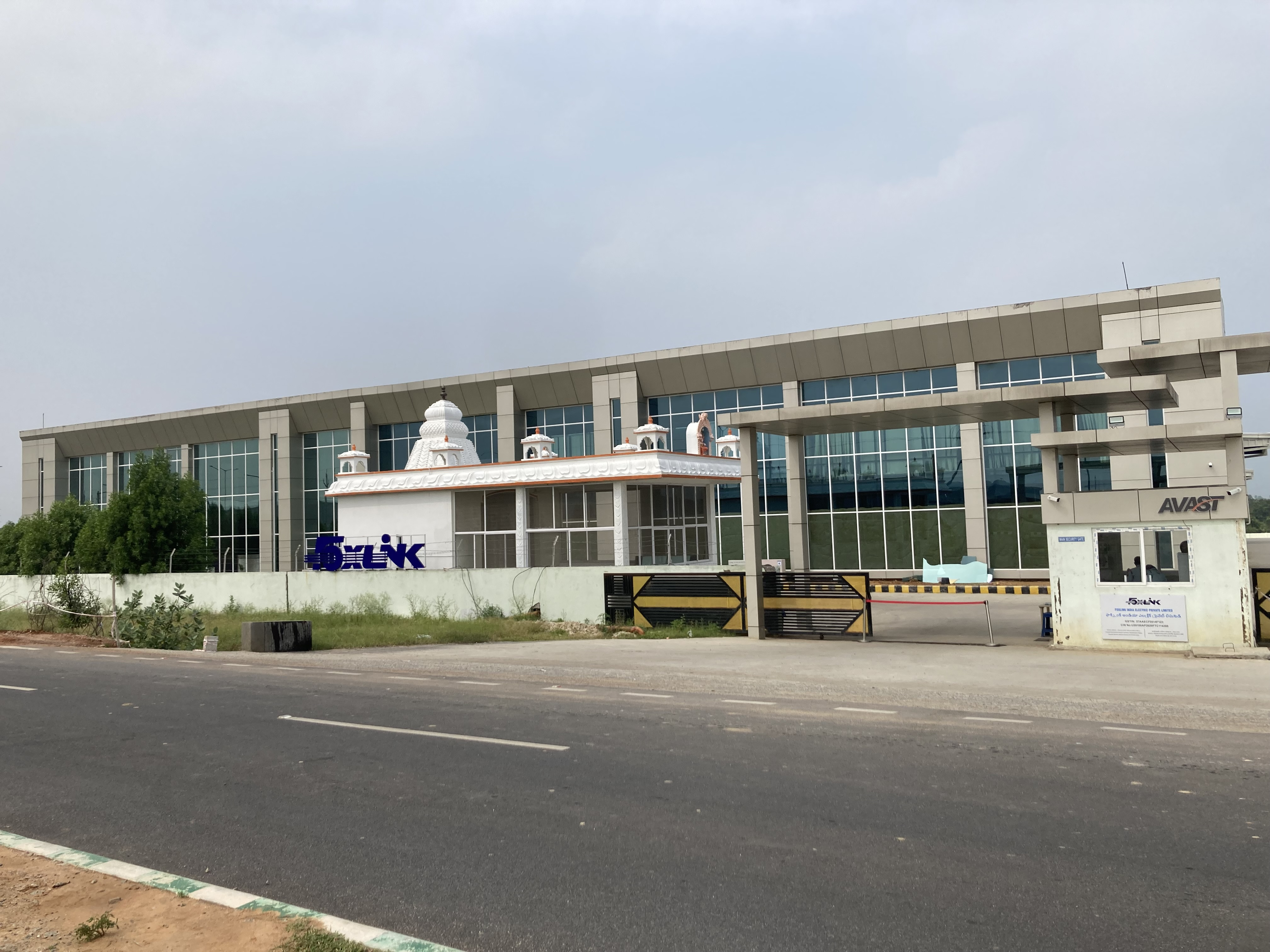
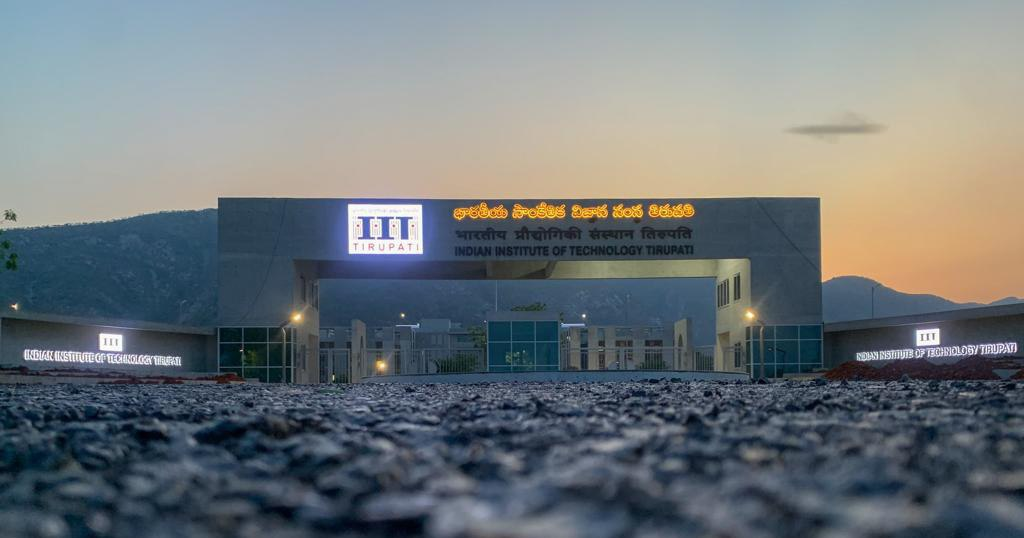
- Sri Venkateswara Temple, Tirumala Alipiri Garuda Circle Sri Venkateswara University Tirupati International Airport Seshachalam Hills Night View of Tirupati City FOXLINK Facility at APIIC EMC Tirupati IIT Tirupati
- Nicknames: Spiritual Capital of Andhra Pradesh,Heritage City,"City Of Devotion"
- Interactive map of Tirupati
- Location in Andhra Pradesh, India Tirupati (India) Tirupati (Asia)
- Coordinates: 13.6355°N 79.4236°E
- Country: India
- State: Andhra Pradesh
- Region: Rayalaseema
- District: Tirupati
- Founded: 24 February 1130; 896 years ago
- Incorporated (municipality): 1 April 1886; 140 years ago
- Incorporated (corporation): 2 March 2007; 19 years ago
- Named for: Venkateswara
- Wards: 66

Government
  - Type: Mayor–Council
  - Body: Tirupati Municipal Corporation(TMC) Tirupati Urban Development Authority(TUDA)
  - Mayor: Vacant (since 18 March 2026)

Area
  - City: 30.01 km^{2} (11.59 sq mi)

Population (2011)
  - City: 295,323
  - Rank: 121st in India; 9th in Andhra Pradesh
  - Density: 9,841/km^{2} (25,490/sq mi)
  - Metro: 461,900
- Demonym(s): Tirupatian, Tirupatollu

Literacy
  - Literates: 229,730
  - Effective literacy rate: 87.55%

Languages
  - Official: Telugu
- Time zone: UTC+5:30 (IST)
- PIN: 517501-10
- Area code: +91–0877
- Geocode: UN/LOCODE IN TIR
- Vehicle registration: Old:AP-03, AP-39, New:AP-40 (from 2023)
- Nominal GDP (2023-24): ₹20,444 crore (equivalent to ₹220 billion or US$2.3 billion in 2026)
- Currency: Indian Rupee, INR
- International Airport: Tirupati International Airport
- Domestic Airport: Tirupati Airport
- Railway Station: Tirupati Main Railway station
- Police: Tirupati district Police
- Website: Tirupati Municipal Corporation(TMC); Tirupati Urban Development Authority(TUDA); Tirupati District

Tirupati (/ˈtɪrʊpɒtɪ/ Tiru-pa-ti) is a city in the Indian state of Andhra Pradesh and serves as the administrative headquarters of Tirupati district. It is known for its significant religious and cultural heritage, being home to the renowned Tirumala Venkateswara Temple, a major Hindu pilgrimage site, as well as other historic temples. The temple is one of the eight Svayam Vyakta Kshetras (self-manifested temples) dedicated to the deity Vishnu. Tirupati is situated 150 km from Chennai, 250 km from Bangalore, and 416 km from Vijayawada.

Tirupati is the second largest city in the Rayalaseema region, after Kurnool. According to the 2011 census of India, Tirupati had a population of 287,035, making it the ninth most populous city in Andhra Pradesh, while the larger urban agglomeration had a population of 459,985, ranking it the seventh largest in the state. The city functions as a municipal corporation and serves as the headquarters for the Tirupati district, Tirumala Tirupati Devasthanams, Tirupati Urban, Tirupati Rural mandals, the Tirupati revenue division, the Andhra Pradesh Southern Power Distribution Company Limited (APSPDCL), and the Tirupati Urban Development Authority (TUDA).

In 2012–2013, Tirupati was recognised by India's Ministry of Tourism as the "Best Heritage City". Additionally, it was selected as one of the hundred Indian cities to be developed under the Smart Cities Mission, a Government of India initiative aimed at urban development and modernisation.

== Etymology ==
In Dravidian, Tiru means sacred or Honourable and Pati, a Dravidian word meaning residence. The prefix "Tiru" (or "Thiru") is a widely recognised Tamil word and is used in many South Indian place names. Tirupati (Tirumala) is referred to as Pushpa-mandapa in Acharya-Hrdayam (13th century).

== History ==
=== Puranas ===
According to Varaha Purana, during Treta Yuga, Rama resided here with Sita and Lakshmana on his return from Lankapuri.

As per the Puranas, a loan of one crore and 11.4 million gold coins was sought by Balaji from Kubera for his marriage with Padmavathi. To pay back the loan, devotees from all over India visit the temple and donate money.

=== Ancient history ===
Tirupati was developed by The city became a great Vaishnava centre during the time of Ramanujacharya in 11th century, from where Srivaishnavism spread to other parts of Andhra Desa. Srikurmam Temple in Srikakulam district of Andhra Pradesh bears the inscription, Tirupati Srivaishnavula Raksha. Tirupati survived the Muslim invasions by accepting to pay Jizya to the Muslims. During the early 1300s Muslim invasion of South India, the idol of Sri Ranganathaswamy Temple, Srirangam was brought to Tirupati for safekeeping.

The temple town for most of the medieval era was part of Vijayanagara Empire until the 17th century and its rulers contributed considerable resources and wealth, notable among whom are Krishna Deva Raya and Achyuta Deva Raya, Sadasiva Raya and Tirumala Deva Raya.

The city has many historical temples including the Venkateswara Temple which bears 1,150 inscriptions in the Sanskrit, Tamil, Telugu and Kannada languages. Out of 1150 inscriptions 236 belong to Pallava, Chola and Pandya dynasties, 169 belonged to Saluva dynasty, 251 belonged to Achyuta Deva Raya period, 130 belonged to Sadasiva Raya period and another 135 originated in Aravidu dynasty. These mostly specify the contributions of the Pallava Kingdom around the ninth century CE, Chola Kingdom around the tenth century CE and the Vijayanagara Empire in the 14th century CE. In the 15th century, Tallapaka Annamacharya sung many songs in praise of the holy town in Telugu. He termed it as divine, including the rocks, streams, trees, animals, and adds that it is heaven on earth. One example of such a song is:

Kattedura Vaikuntamu Kaanachaina Konda
Thettalaya Mahimale Tirumala Konda ||
Vedamulae Silalai Velasinadi Konda
Yedesa Punya Rasule Yerulainadi Konda
Gadili Brahmadi Lokamula Konalu Konda
Sree Devudundeti Seshadri Konda ||

Tirumala, in all its right, is heaven. Its powers are indescribable. The Vedas have taken the form of rocks and appeared on Tirumala. Holiness has taken the form of water and is flowing as streams on Tirumala. Its holy peaks are Brahmaloka and other lokas. Srinivasa lives on Seshadri.

There was no human settlement at lower Tirupati until 1500. With the growing importance of upper Tirupati, a village formed at the present-day Kapilatheertham Road area and was named "kotturu". It was later shifted to the vicinity of Govindarajaswamy Temple which was consecrated around the year 1130 CE. Later the village grew into its present-day form around Govindaraja Swamy Temple which is now the heart of the city. It has now gained a lot of popularity as a tourism place.

=== Modern history ===
In 1932, Tirumala Venkateswara Temple was handed over to Tirumala Tirupati Devasthanams by the TTD Act of 1932. In 2006, Tirupati Urban Development Authority (TUDA) and TTD together conducted "Tirupati Utsavam" which focused on the history of development of Tirupati town, kings who visited Tirumala and their contribution for development of the temple. The fourth World Telugu Conference, a conference for furtherance of Telugu language, was conducted at Tirupati during December 2012 for three days. In January 2017, the 104th Indian Science Congress (ISCA) meeting was held in Tirupati.

== Geography ==
Tirupati is located in the Tirupati district of Andhra Pradesh state in southern India. Tirupati lies at the foot of Seshachalam Hills of Eastern Ghats which were formed during Precambrian era. One of its suburbs, Tirumala, which is home to Sri Venkateswara Temple, is located within the hills. Tirupati Urban Development Authority includes Tirupati (City), Renigunta, Chandragiri, and census towns Akkarampalle, Avilala, Cherlopalle, Mangalam, Peruru, Settipalle, Thummala gunta (part), Timminaidupalle, Tiruchanur, Tirupati (NMA). Tirupati is surrounded by Srikalahasti towards the east, Puttur towards the south, Pakala towards the west and the Seshachalam hills (Tirumala) towards the north. Swarnamukhi river originates in Chandragiri Hills and passes through the Tirupati City before reaching Srikalahasti in the east.

=== Environment ===
==== Geology ====
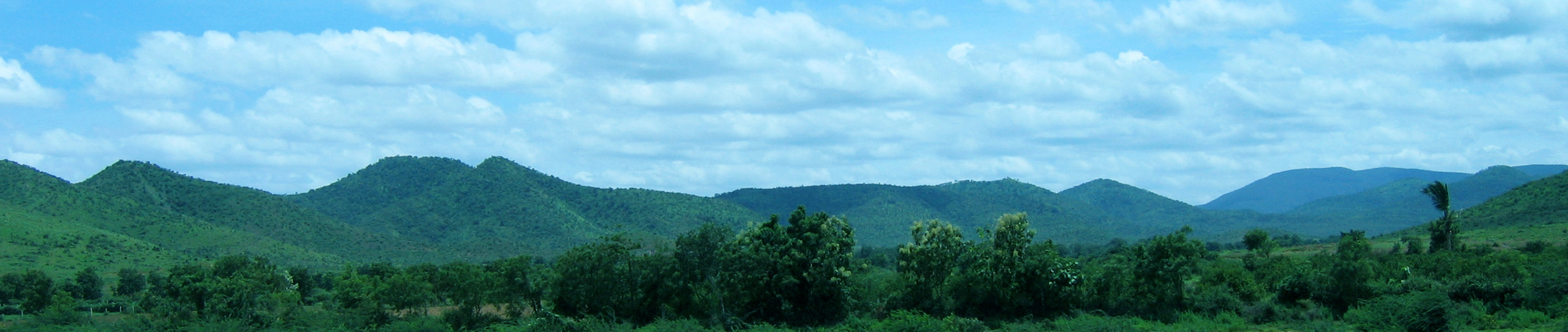
View Tirumala Hills from Tirupati

At the 12 km (7.5 mi) point on the Tirupati – Tirumala ghat road, there is a major discontinuity of stratigraphic significance that represents a period of remarkable serenity in the geological history of the Earth. This is referred to as Eparchaean Unconformity. This unconformity separates the Nagari Quartzite of the Proterozoic from the granite of the Archean. In 2001, the Geological Survey of India (GSI) declared the Eparchaean Unconfirmity to be one of the 26 "Geological Monuments of India".

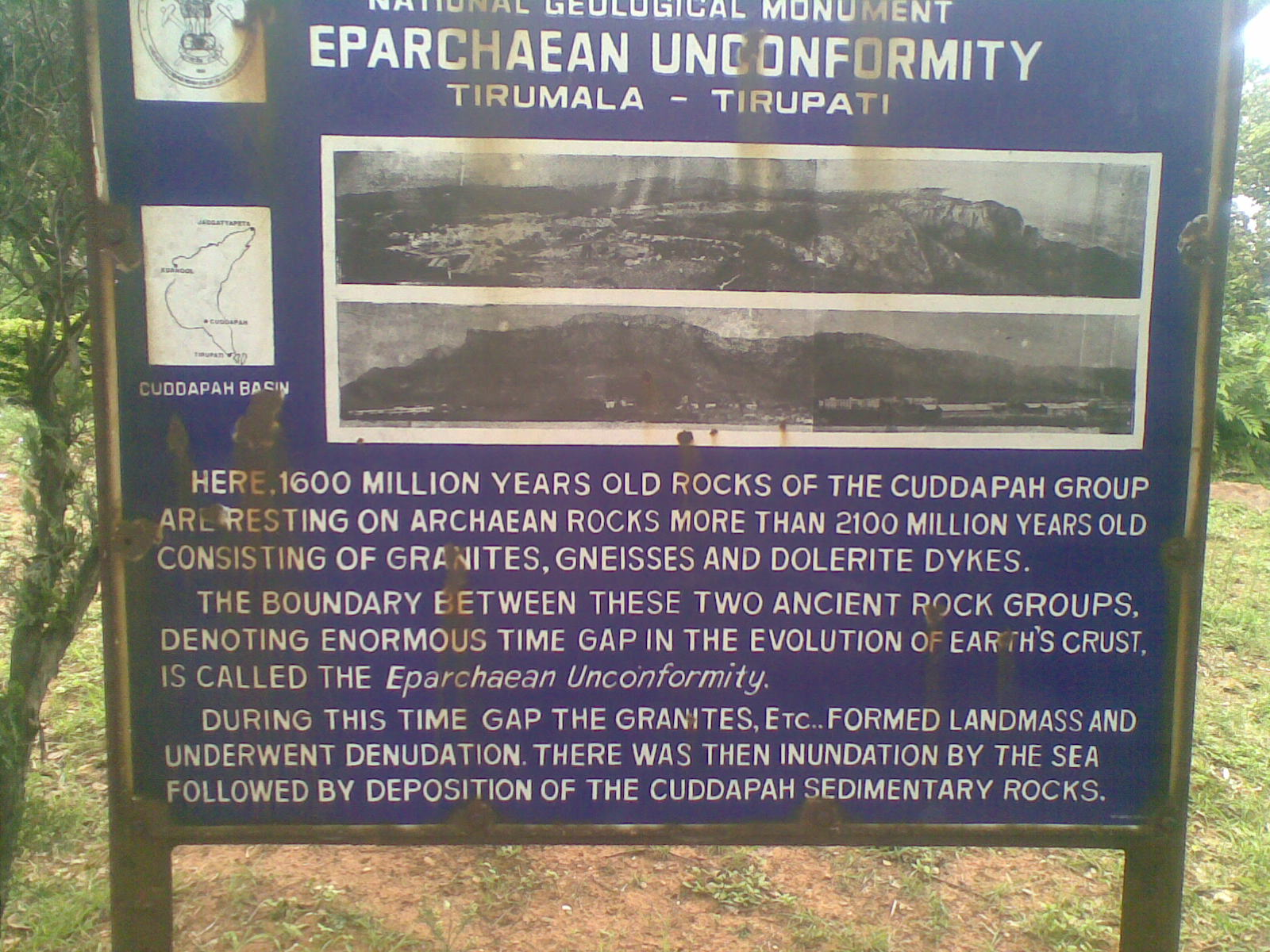
A board in Tirumala hills briefing details of Eparchaean Unconformity

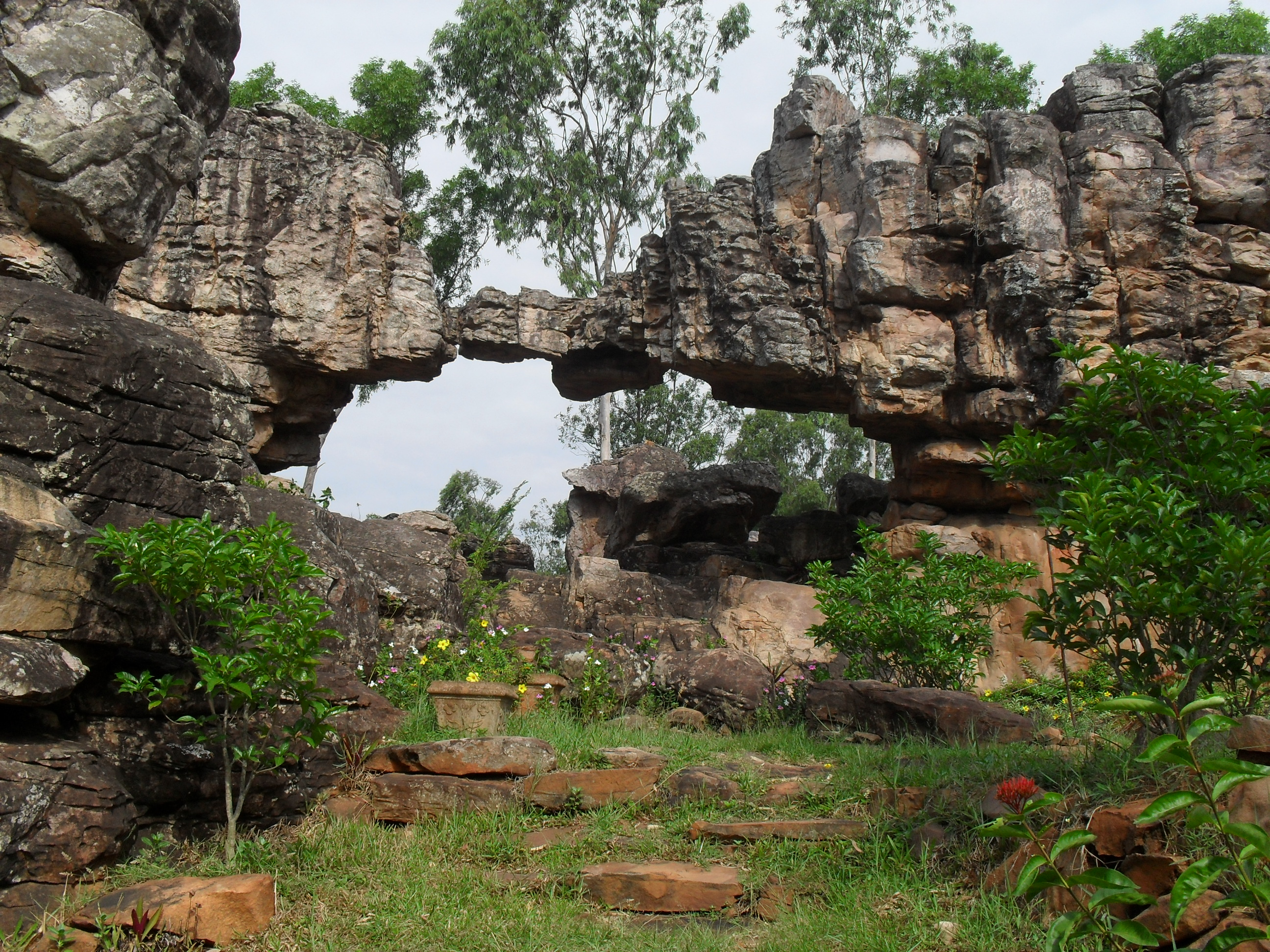
Silathoranam (natural arch) at Seshachalam Hills, Tirumala, Andhra Pradesh

Silathoranam, a natural arch and a distinctive geological feature, is located in the Tirumala Hills at a distance of 1 km (0.62 mi) from Tirumala Venkateswara Temple. The arch measures 8 metres in width and 3 metres in height and is eroded from quartzite of Cuddapah Supergroup of Middle to Upper Proterozoic (1600 to 570 Ma) by weathering agents like water and wind.

=== Flora and fauna ===
Sri Venkateswara National Park is a national park and biosphere reserve which is part of Seshachalam hills. The total area of the park is 353 km^{2} (136 sq mi). The park is home to about 1,500 vascular plant species belonging to 174 families. Some of the rare and endemic plant species like red sanders, Shorea talura, Shorea thumburggaia, Terminalia pallida, sandalwood, Syzygium alternifolium, and Psilotum nudum occur in this region. Cycas beddomei, a species of cycad in the genus Cycas, is found only in the Tirumala Hills.

About 178 species of birds from this national park have been identified which includes the globally threatened yellow-throated bulbul, grey-fronted green pigeon, critically endangered Oriental white-backed vulture, large hawk-cuckoo, blue-faced malkoha, yellow-browed bulbul, Indian scimitar-babbler and Loten's sunbird. Among predators the leopard is quite common, along with the wild dog. Among reptiles, the most interesting species is the gliding lizard, found in some deep forested valleys. Another important reptile of this national park is the golden gecko.

Established in 1987, Tirupati Zoo or Sri Venkateswara Zoological Park is a zoo located at Tirupati and is Asia's largest zoo, with an area of 5500 acres. It is built on the concept of Hindu mythology. It exhibits only animals that are mentioned in the ancient epics like Ramayana, Mahabharatha, and Panchatantra. The enclosures are named based on Indian mythology. It hosts a wide range of animals such as deer, monkeys, lions, tigers, bears, elephants, peafowl, grey pelicans, marsh crocodiles, and starred tortoises.

Sri Venkateswara Gosamrakshana shala is a home for cattle received as a donation (Godanam). It was established in 1956 by TTD and renamed to S.V. Gosamrakshana Shala in 2004. It is located at Chandragiri road, Tirupati. It is maintained by Tirumala Tirupati Devasthanams using the funds received through the Sri Venkateswara Gosamrakshana Shala Trust. Activities of the trust include providing a good environment, management, and feeding for the cattle. The milk and its products produced here are used by TTD for daily rituals at Sri Venkateswara Temple and other TTD temples.

=== Climate ===
Tirupati has a tropical savanna climate under the Köppen climate classification system, specifically Aw (dry "winter"), closely bordering As (dry "summer"). During the dry season, which lasts from January to May, average minimum temperatures are between 18 and 28 °C (64.4 and 82.4 °F). The dry season is followed by the rainy season, which lasts from June until the end of December. The city experiences heavy rainfall in November during the northeast monsoon season. The highest rainfall in 24 hours (219 millimetres or 8.62 inches) was on 16 November 2015, during the 2015 South India floods. Cyclones commonly hit the Coast of Nellore and bring heavy rain to the city.

Climate data for Tirupati (Tirupati Airport) 1991–2020, extremes 1981–2020
Month	Jan	Feb	Mar	Apr	May	Jun	Jul	Aug	Sep	Oct	Nov	Dec	Year
Record high °C (°F)	35.6 (96.1)	39.9 (103.8)	43.0 (109.4)	45.7 (114.3)	45.5 (113.9)	45.2 (113.4)	40.8 (105.4)	40.0 (104.0)	43.1 (109.6)	39.0 (102.2)	37.1 (98.8)	34.3 (93.7)	45.7 (114.3)
Mean daily maximum °C (°F)	30.3 (86.5)	33.3 (91.9)	37.1 (98.8)	39.3 (102.7)	40.5 (104.9)	38.1 (100.6)	36.1 (97.0)	35.1 (95.2)	34.9 (94.8)	33.1 (91.6)	30.4 (86.7)	29.2 (84.6)	34.8 (94.6)
Mean daily minimum °C (°F)	18.8 (65.8)	19.9 (67.8)	22.9 (73.2)	26.3 (79.3)	28.1 (82.6)	27.4 (81.3)	26.3 (79.3)	25.9 (78.6)	25.3 (77.5)	23.9 (75.0)	22.0 (71.6)	20.0 (68.0)	23.9 (75.0)
Record low °C (°F)	12.9 (55.2)	11.9 (53.4)	14.2 (57.6)	20.0 (68.0)	20.4 (68.7)	21.5 (70.7)	20.6 (69.1)	21.4 (70.5)	21.0 (69.8)	16.5 (61.7)	15.0 (59.0)	13.5 (56.3)	11.9 (53.4)
Average rainfall mm (inches)	12.2 (0.48)	7.9 (0.31)	8.4 (0.33)	17.5 (0.69)	50.0 (1.97)	84.2 (3.31)	110.5 (4.35)	130.5 (5.14)	111.9 (4.41)	207.8 (8.18)	260.3 (10.25)	112.3 (4.42)	1,113.5 (43.84)
Average rainy days	0.8	0.4	0.5	1.3	2.6	5.2	7.1	7.2	6.7	9.5	9.4	4.4	55.1
Average relative humidity (%) (at 17:30 IST)	56	45	37	38	39	46	50	53	57	65	71	65	52
Source: India Meteorological Department

== Demographics ==
Religions in Tirupati (2011)
Religion	Percent
Hinduism	92.82%
Islam	6.05%
Christianity	0.74%
Other or not stated	0.39%
Distribution of religions

As of 2011 Census of India, the Tirupati city municipal corporation had a population of 287,035. The total population constitutes 145,977 males and 141,058 females — a sex ratio of 966 females per 1000 males, higher than the national average of 940 per 1000. There were 24,643 children in the age group of 0–6 years. It had an effective literacy rate (7+ copulation) of 87.55%. The urban agglomeration had a population of 459,985, of whom males constitute 231,456, females constitute 228,529 — a sex ratio of 987 females per 1000 males and 41,589 children are in the age group of 0–6 years. There are a total of 356,558 literates with an effective literacy rate (7+ population) of 85.22%.

Languages of Tirupati (2011)
1. Telugu (88.0%)
2. Urdu (5.50%)
3. Tamil (3.40%)
4. Hindi (1.01%)
5. Others (2.11%)

Telugu is the official and the most commonly spoken language (87.98%). It is followed by Urdu (5.50%) and Tamil (3.40%), Hindi (1.01%) which are spoken in small numbers.

== Governance ==
Tirupati Assembly constituency is one of the 175 assembly constituencies of Andhra Pradesh Legislative Assembly, India. Tirupati is part of Tirupati (Lok Sabha constituency). Maddila Gurumoorthy of YSR Congress Party is the sitting Member of Parliament for Tirupati (Lok Sabha constituency).

Arani Srinivasulu of Janasena Party is the sitting Member of Legislative Assembly for Tirupati (Assembly constituency), The Tirupati Urban Development Authority (TUDA) Chairman is Dr.C.Divakar Reddy and the Chairman Of Tirumala Tirupati Devasthanams is Bollineni Rajagopal Naidu.

Under the administration of TTD, Tirupati & Tirumala has seen continued emphasis on improving pilgrimage infrastructure, including the implementation of welfare schemes aimed at supporting devotees visiting the Sri Venkateswara Temple.

=== Civic administration ===
Tirupati Municipal Corporation (TMC) oversees the administration of the city. Tirupati was constituted as a municipality on 1 April 1886; it was upgraded to a second grade municipality on 1 October 1962, to a first grade municipality on 12 December 1965, to special grade municipality on 13 February 1970, and to selection grade municipality on 7 October 1998. Tirupati Municipality was upgraded to a municipal corporation on 2 March 2007. The area of the municipal corporation at the time of formation was 16.59 square kilometres (6.41 mi^{2}). While, at present the area of the city is 27.44 square kilometres (10.59 mi^{2}). Tirupati has been ranked among the top ten cleanest cities in India as per Swachh Survekshan 2022 report.

Tirupati Urban Development Authority (TUDA) is the urban planning authority. It was constituted in the year 1981, with Tirupati city and 89 villages under its jurisdiction. In 2008, it included Srikalahasti, Puttur and 69 surrounding villages. At present TUDA covers an area of 1,211.51 km^{2} (467.77 sq mi).

=== Law and order ===
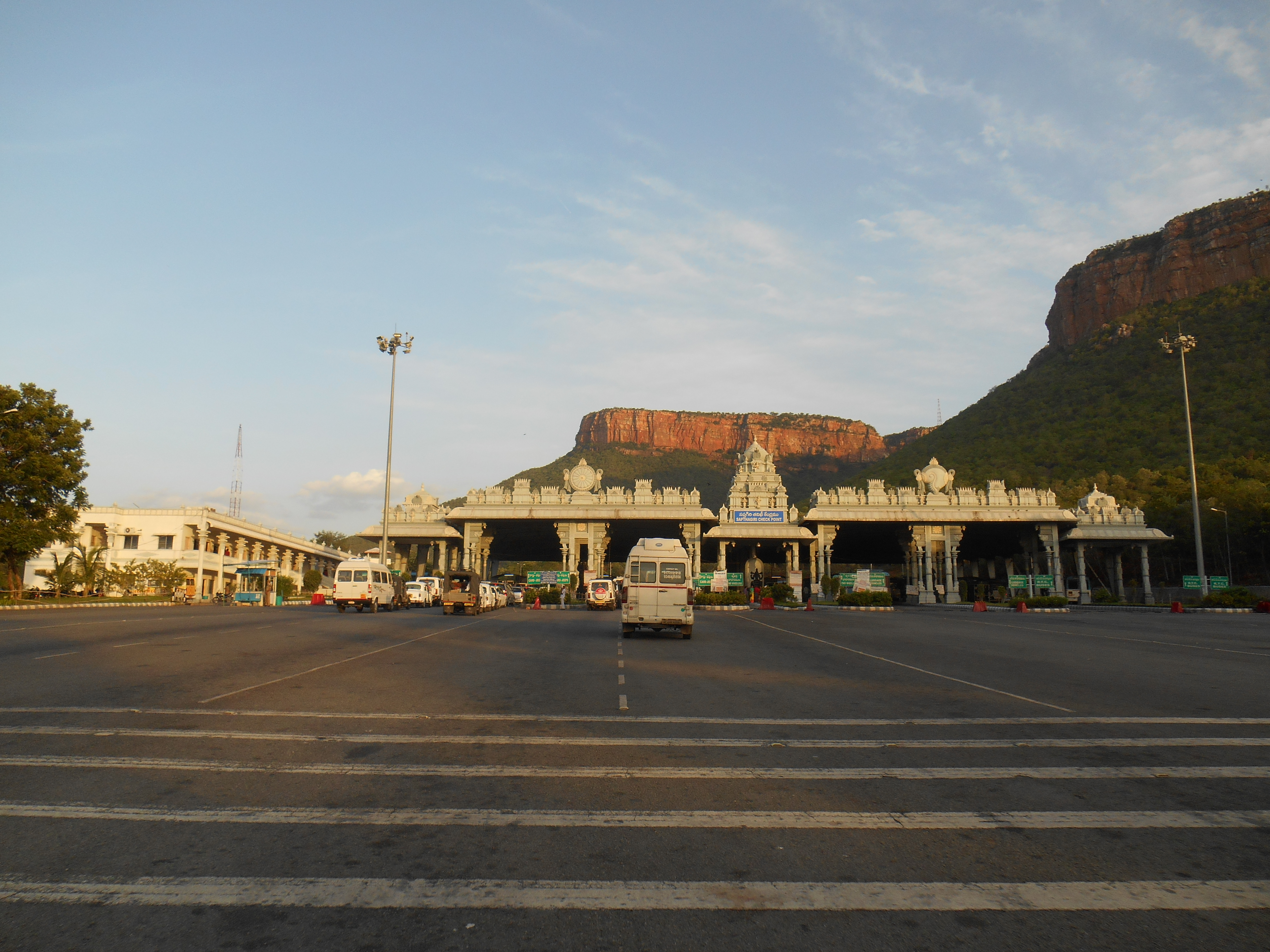
Sapthagiri Security Zone at Alipiri-Tirupati

Tirupati has the status of Tirupati Urban Police District; it has 25 police stations. 100 Octopus (Organisation For Counter Terrorist Operations) commandos are deployed at Tirupati temple for its security. This was formed by Government of Andhra Pradesh in the year 2012. The elite commando force has been specially trained for in-house intervention, hostage rescue and in the Israeli combat technique Krav Maga.

At Alipiri, a security zone was established to screen vehicles and pilgrims entering Tirumala, to safeguard the hills from terrorists and anti-social elements. To ensure more safety in Tirumala-Tirupati, the government of Andhra Pradesh started a project called "Safe City-Tirupati": the Tirupati temple and the city is under 24*7 CCTV surveillance with 3000 CCTV cameras, monitored from a command-and-control centre. Baggage scanners and Explosives detectors are installed at several places.

=== Utility services ===
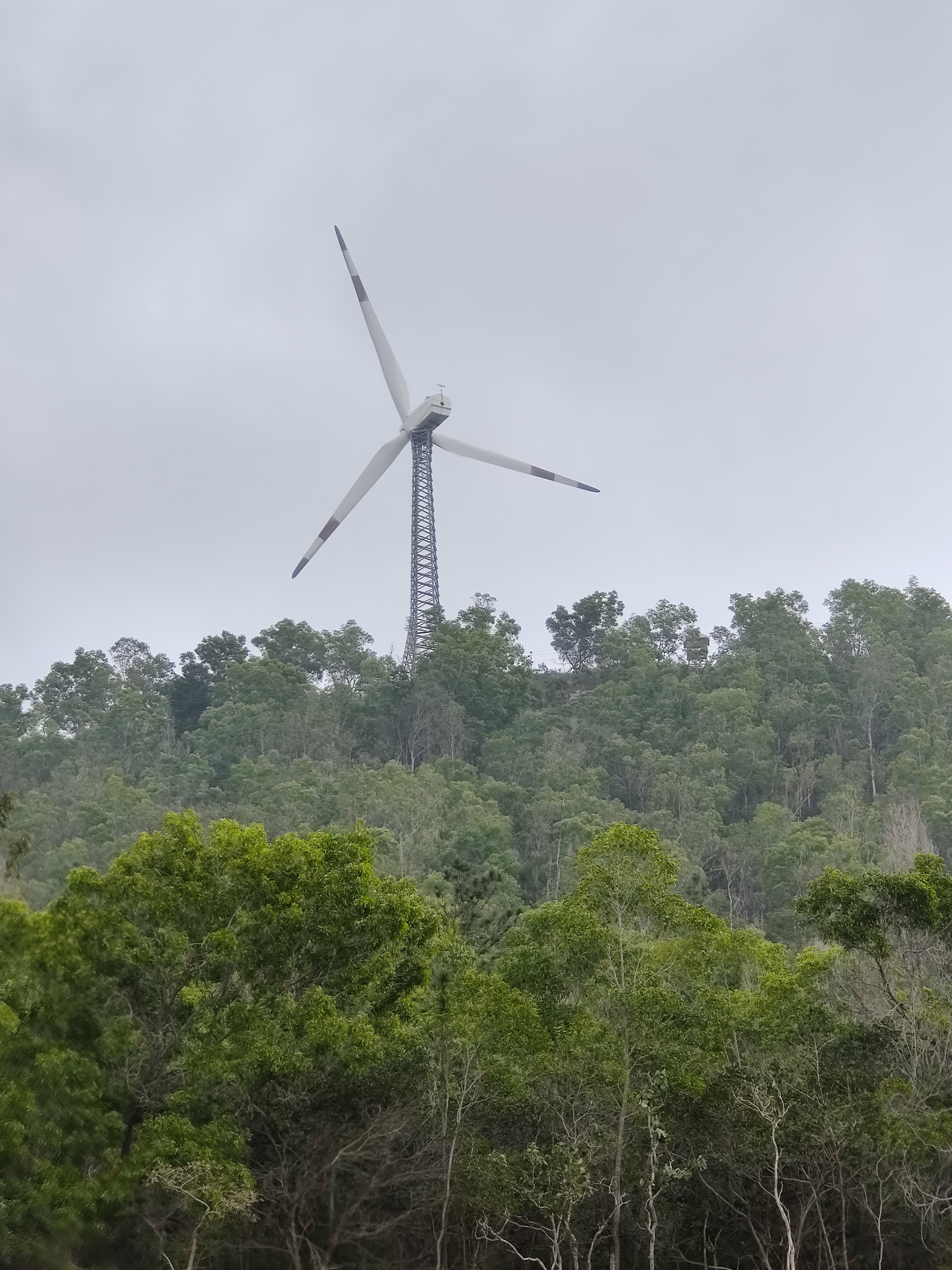
Wind Turbines on the hills of Tirumala

Electricity to the city is distributed by Andhra Pradesh Southern Power Distribution Company Limited (APSPDCL), headquartered at Tirupati. The city mostly depends on groundwater for its needs, though it also gets water from Telugu Ganga canal and Kalyani dam. There are dams in the vicinity: Kalyani Dam, Papavinasanam Dam, Gogurbham Dam, Pasupudara Dam, Kumaradara Dam, Akasa Ganga, all in the Tirumala Hill ranges. Of these, Papavinasanam, Gogurbham, Pasupudara, kumaradara, and Akasa Ganga completely cater to the water needs of Tirumala and Venkateswara Temple while 49% of Kalyani Dam water is being supplied to Tirumala and remaining water is supplied to Tirupati.

Tirupati falls under the Tirupati Telecom District of the Bharat Sanchar Nigam Limited (BSNL). BSNL is planning to establish 27 Wi-Fi hotspots in the city. The city also has a Regional Passport Seva Kendra (PSK). PSK-Tirupati will cover Prakasam, Nellore, Chittoor, Kadapa, Kurnool and Anantapur districts of Andhra Pradesh and will come under Vijayawada Passport Office.

The city ranked sixth in India among the 200 cities that competed during Swachh Survekshan – 2018 conducted by Ministry of Urban Development, Government of India, and the Central Pollution Control Board (CPCB) of India. According to the National Urban Sanitation Policy, the city was ranked 117th in the country in 2009–10, with a total of 39.363 points. As part of 'Swachh Tirupati', Tirupati Municipal Corporation has started household waste segregation programme. As of May 2015, 150 Tonnes of waste is being collected per day from households within the municipal limits. The city is the 11th cleanliest city with 66 points in the cleanliness scorecard, published by Union Tourism Ministry of India.

=== Healthcare ===
Tirupati is a medical hub with major hospitals situated in its vicinity. Many of these are either run under State government or run/funded by Tirumala Tirupati Devasthanams (TTD).

SVAravind EYE Hospital Tirupati

Sri Venkateswara Ramnarain Ruia Government General Hospital is one of the largest in the state of Andhra Pradesh, and the main government hospital for the Rayalaseema region. It was started in the year 1962 with a donation of Rs.5 lakhs from Sri Radha Krishna N. Ruia and 15 lakhs from TTD. At present it has 750 beds. Sri Venkateswara Institute of Medical Sciences (SVIMS) is another major medical institute, founded in 1986.

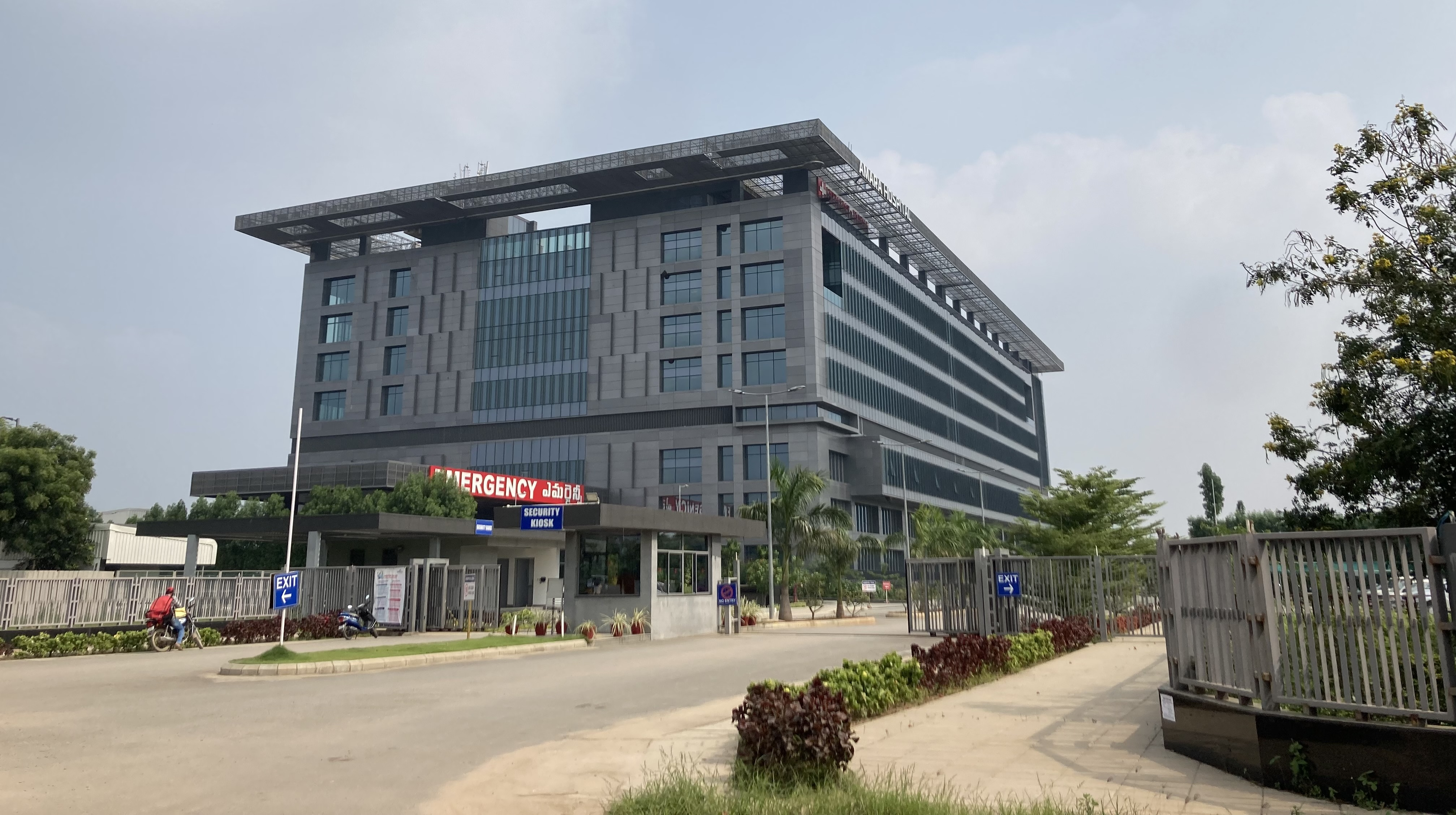
Private medical facility

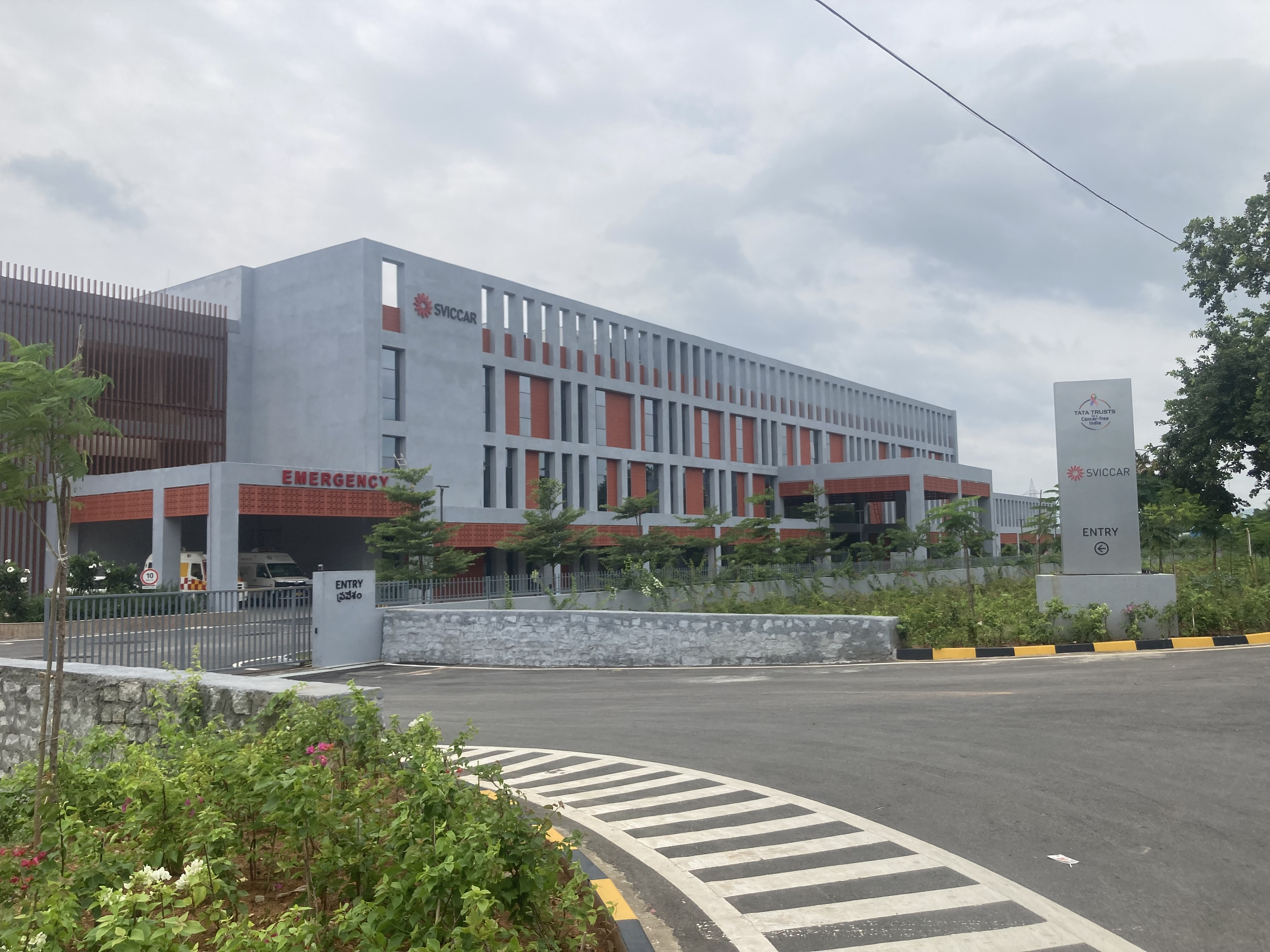
SVICCAR (Cancer) Facility at Tirupati

Balaji Institute of Surgery, Research and Rehabilitation for the Disabled (BIRRD) has 250 beds; it was established in 1985 by TTD to treat patients with polio myelitis, cerebral palsy, congenital anomalies, spinal injuries, and orthopaedic impairments. A non-profit organisation, it is run with funds from Tirumala Tirupati Devasthanams and donations from the public. Government Maternity Hospital (GMH) in Tirupati is the largest maternity hospital in the state in terms of number of deliveries. Established over 50 years ago, GMH serves pregnant woman from Chittoor, YSR, Nellore, Anantapur districts of Andhra Pradesh and few areas of Tamil Nadu. GMH was named "best hospital" under the "sterilization and institutional deliveries category" by the Ministry of Health and Family Welfare for the year 2013.

== Economy ==
=== City economic overview ===
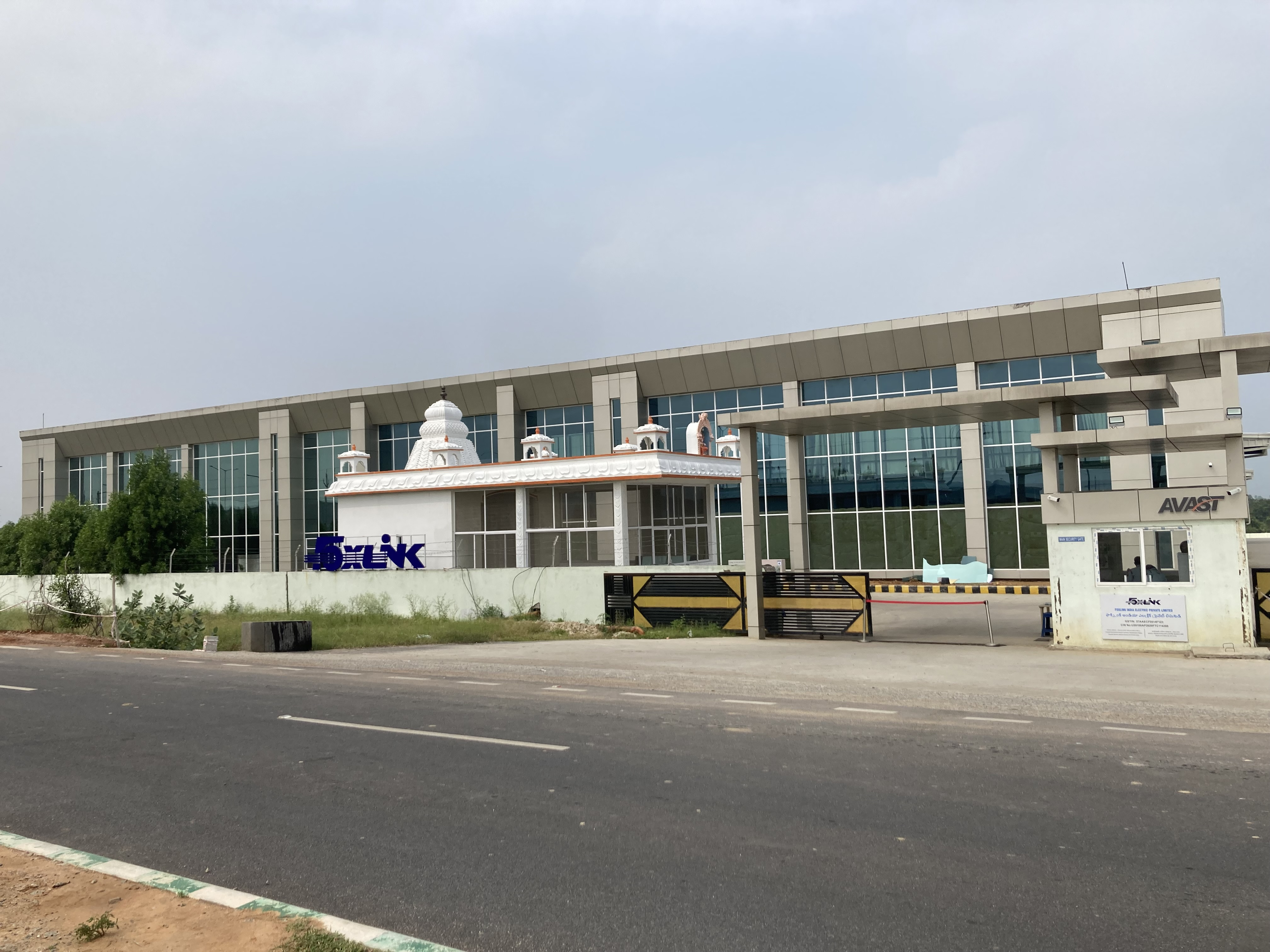
FOXLINK Facility at APIIC Park Tpty

Tourism is the major industry in Tirupati.

The entire economy directly or indirectly depends on Tirumala Tirupati Devasthanams (TTD). TTD is headquartered at Tirupati. Established in 1932, TTD is an independent trust which manages Tirumala Venkateswara Temple and other temples in Tirupati and all over the world. It is also involved in several social activities. As Tirupati is a major religious tourist destination, the hospitality industry is also a major industry which includes many 3 star hotels and lodges.

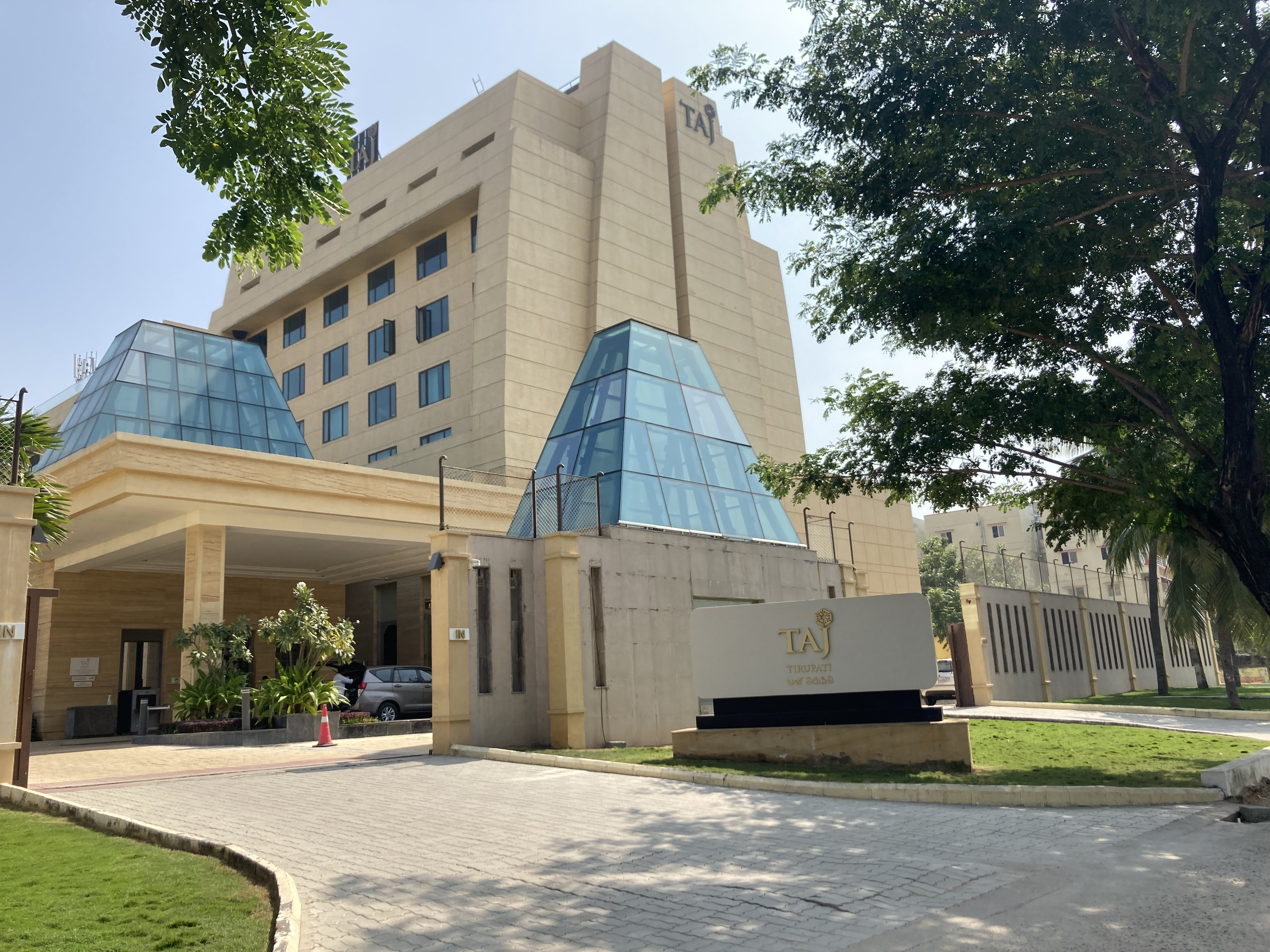
Taj Group of Hotel Tirupati

Andhra Pradesh Southern Power Distribution Company Limited (APSPDCL) is also headquartered at Tirupati. Gandhi Road, Prakasam Road, V.V Mahal Road, AIR Bypass Road are highly commercial areas in the city. Major brands of automobile, textile, mobile, electrical and electronic companies have their outlets in Tirupati.

APIIC Industrial Park is located at Gajulamandyam, Renigunta. Industries like Sri Venkateswara Cooperative Sugar Factory Limited, AshwiniBio Pharma Ltd and others are situated in this park. Amara Raja factory is located at Karakambadi, Renigunta. Lanco cement factory is located at Eerpedu mandal. The majority of the city residents are employed under TTD. Zoho, an Indian software development company has an office in Renigunta and has been operating from this office since 2018.

=== IT/ITES and electronics industry ===
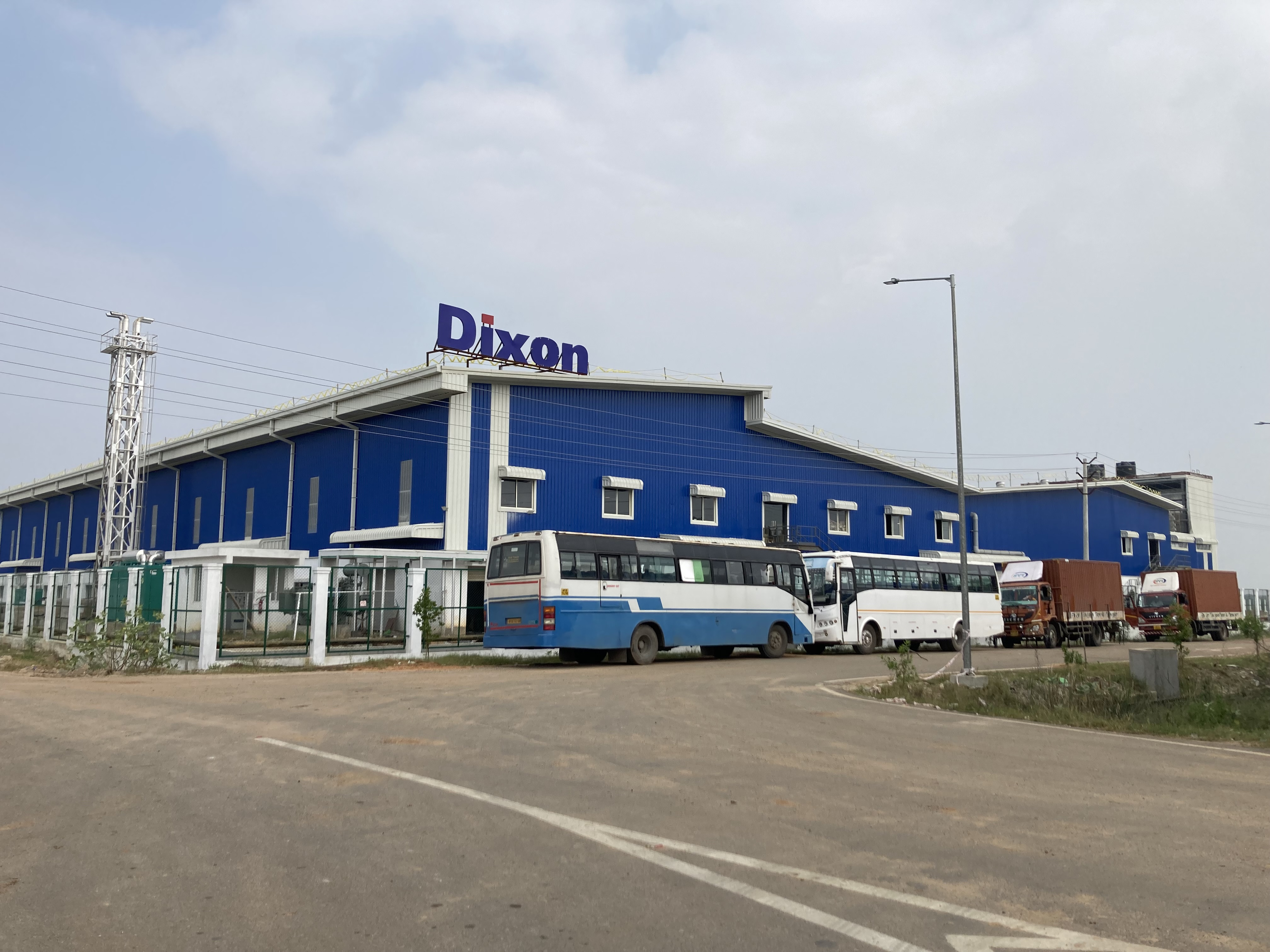
DIXON Facility at APIIC EMC Tpty

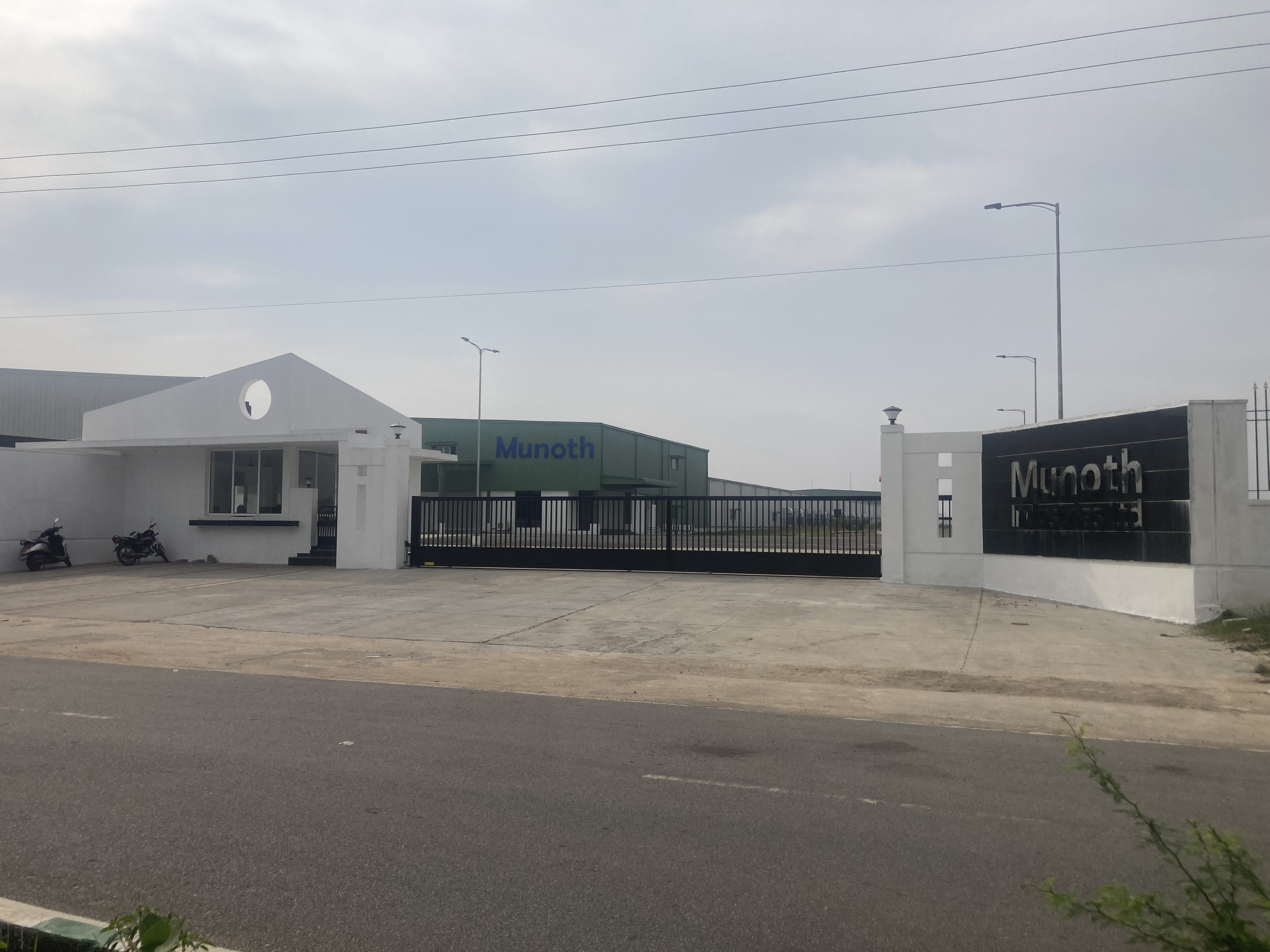
Munoth Lithium Ion Cell Manufacturing Facility First of its kind in India

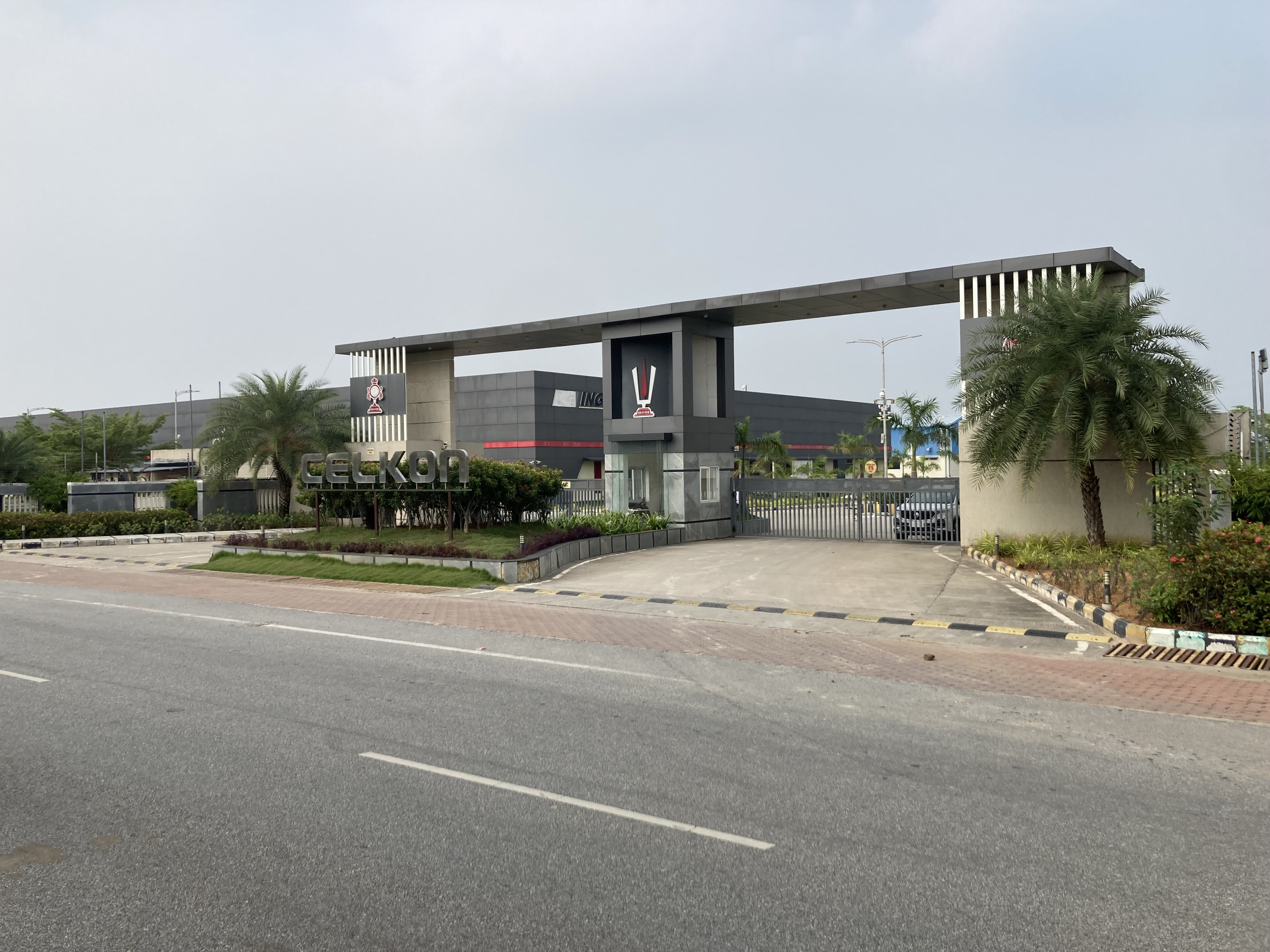
CELKON Manufacturing plant at Tirupati

Sri Venkateswara Mobile and Electronics Manufacturing Hub is a dedicated mobile handset and electronics manufacturing facility located at Tirupati. The hub is spread over 122 acres (49 ha) Acres out of which Celkon is established in 20 acres (8.1 ha) acres, Micromax in 15 acres (6.1 ha) acres, Karbonn in 15.28 acres (6.18 ha) acres and Lava in 20 acres (8.1 ha) acres with a total investment of Rupees 2000 crores. Dixon Technologies has a manufacturing unit in this hub, where they are producing Smart TVs for Xiaomi.

=== Tourism sector ===
The Tirumala Venkateswara Temple and a number of other temples in and around the city attract large numbers of tourists. Tirumala is said to be one of the most visited religious sites on earth, and Tirupati Temple is currently a Guinness World Record holder for most visited temple in the world.

== Culture ==
=== Festivals ===
The city celebrates all major Hindu festivals, including Sankranti, Ugadi, Krishna Janmashtami, Maha Shivaratri, Ganesh Chaturthi, Deepavali, Rama Navami, and Kartik Poornima. Srivari Brahmotsavam is a nine-day event, celebrated during the months of September–October, when the temple of Tirumala witnesses lakhs of devotees. During this festival, the processional deity Malayappa of Venkateswara Temple, along with his consorts Sridevi and Bhudevi, is taken in a procession in four mada streets around the temple on different Vahanams. Tirupati also celebrates a carnival named as Tirupati Ganga Jatara, held during second week of May every year. This is a week long festival where Gangamma (Gramadevata) is worshiped. The tank behind Padmavathi Temple, Tiruchanur has Padma Pushkarini, where Chakra Snanam is undertaken on last day of the annual Padmavathi Brahmotsavams (Panchami Teertham). It witnesses lakhs of Devotees taking a dip in the holy waters.

Vaikunta Ekadasi, the day on which it is believed that Vaikunta Dwarams will be opened and the most important Vasihnavite festival, is celebrated in Tirumala and Tirupati with grandeur. Rathasapthami is another festival, celebrated in February, when Venkateswara's processional deity (Malayappa swami) is taken in a procession around the temple on seven different vahanas from early morning to late night.

Sri Krishna janmastami, also known as Gokulashtami, is celebrated with great fervour at Tirupati. The Lotus Temple belonging to International Society for Krishna Consciousness (ISKCON) is illuminated with lamps and paintings displaying themes from Srimad Bhagavatham. The celebrations include offering prayers to Sri Krishna, Utlotsavam, Annamayya Kirtana alapana, Geetha Parayanam among others. On this day 'Gokulashtami Asthanam' is held at Tirumala Venkateswara Temple. TTD also celebrates janmastami at Sri Venkateswara Gosamrakshana Shala where prayers are offered to cows, horses and elephants. Maha Shivaratri and Kartik Poornima are the most auspicious occasions celebrated in Kapila Theertham.

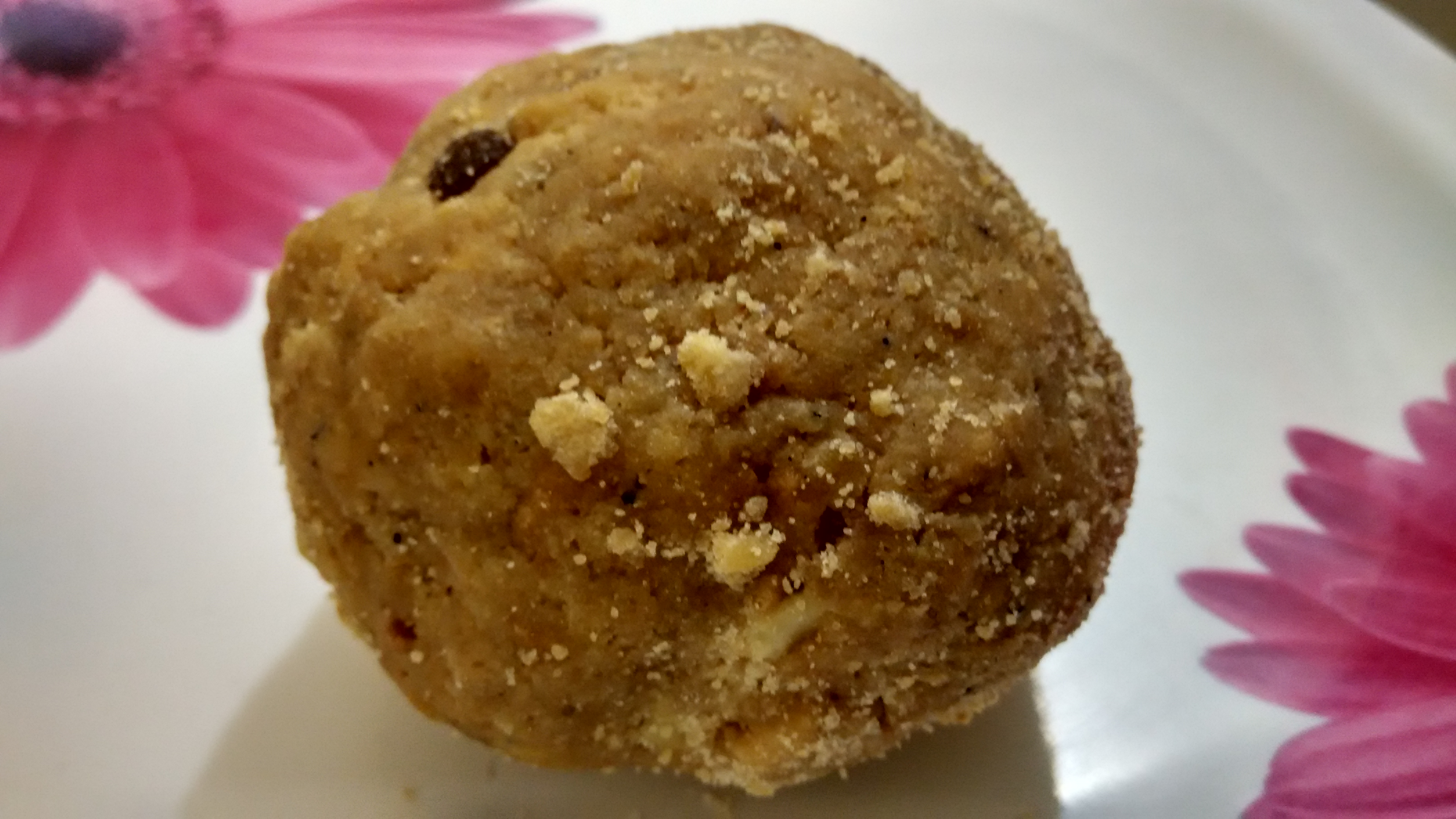
Tirupati Laddu (Srivari Laddu) offered to Venkateswara at Tirupati Temple

=== Cuisine ===
The city's Tirupati Laddu is world famous among Hindu devotees around the world. It is the prasadam at Venkateswara Temple, Tirumala. Tirupati Laddu was awarded the Geographical indication tag which entitles only Tirumala Tirupati Devasthanams to make or sell it.

=== Arts, crafts and architecture ===
Tirumala Tirupati Devasthanams established Sri Venkateswara Museum, one at Tirumala and the other at Tirupati. It has a wonderful collection of Tirupati temple architecture and historical artefacts, such as ancient weaponry, pooja items and idols. It has a comprehensive photo gallery that gives a unique insight into Tirupati region's culture and traditions. It also boasts a meditation centre. In 1988–89 Archaeological Survey of India had established an archaeological museum in the Chandragiri fort at Chandragiri. It exhibits rich collection of stone and metal sculptures of Hindu gods and other cultural vestiges retrieved from other historical places like Gudimallam, Gandikota and Yaganti. It also includes galleries for medieval weaponry of swords and daggers, coins and paper documents.

== Cityscape ==
=== Temples ===
Tirumala Venkateswara Temple is the most notable temple for being the world's richest Vaishnavite temple of Venkateswara. Beside Venkateswara Temple, the city is known for many other ancient temples, such as Padmavathi Temple at Tiruchanur, Govindaraja Temple, Kapileswara Temple at Kapila Theertham, Kalyana Venkateswara Temple, Srinivasamangapuram, Thathayyaguntta Gangamma Temple of goddess Gangamma is the Gramadevata of Tirupati, Sri Kodandaramaswami Temple etc.

Hindu Temples in Tirupati

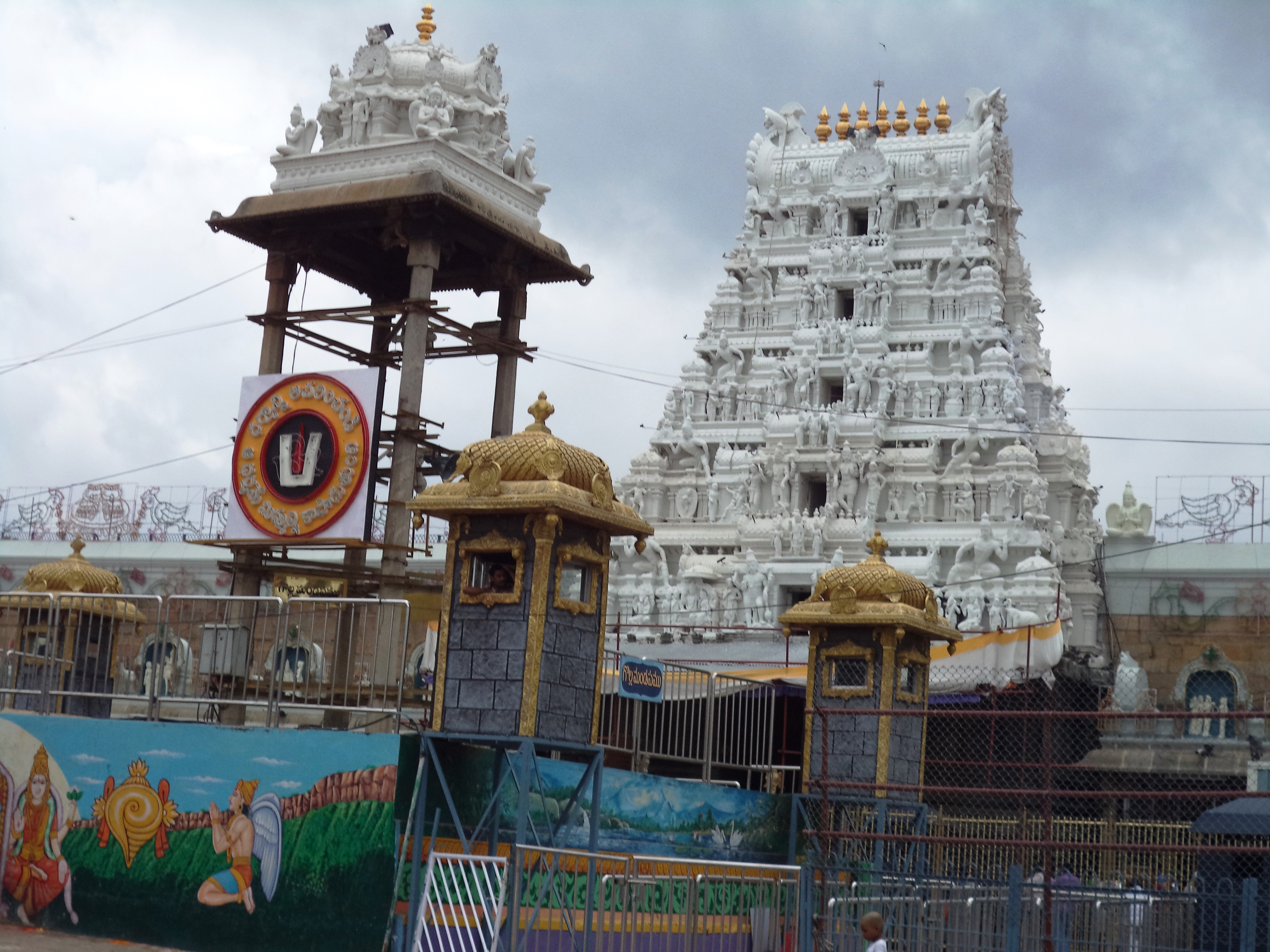
Venkateswara Temple

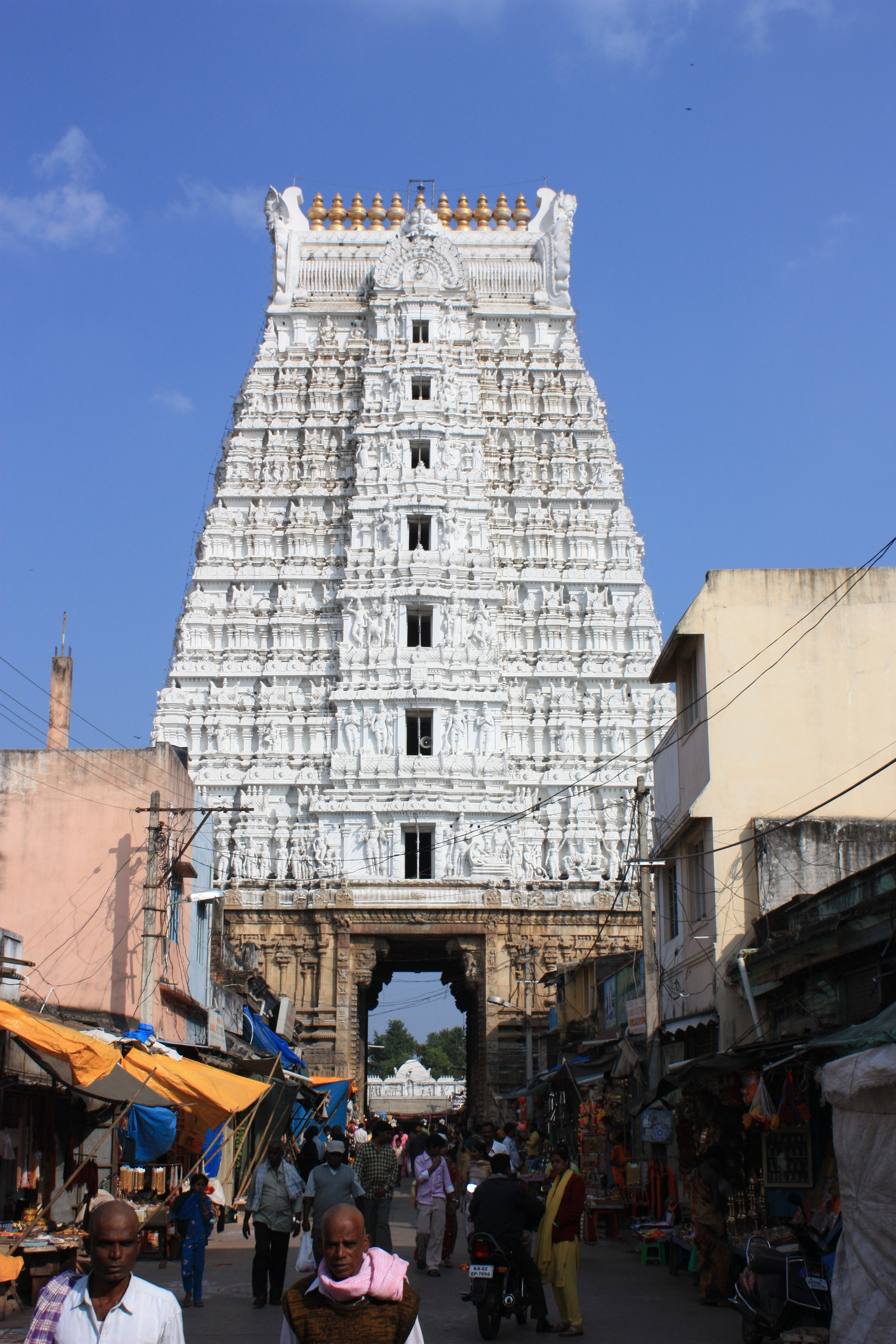
Govindaraja Temple

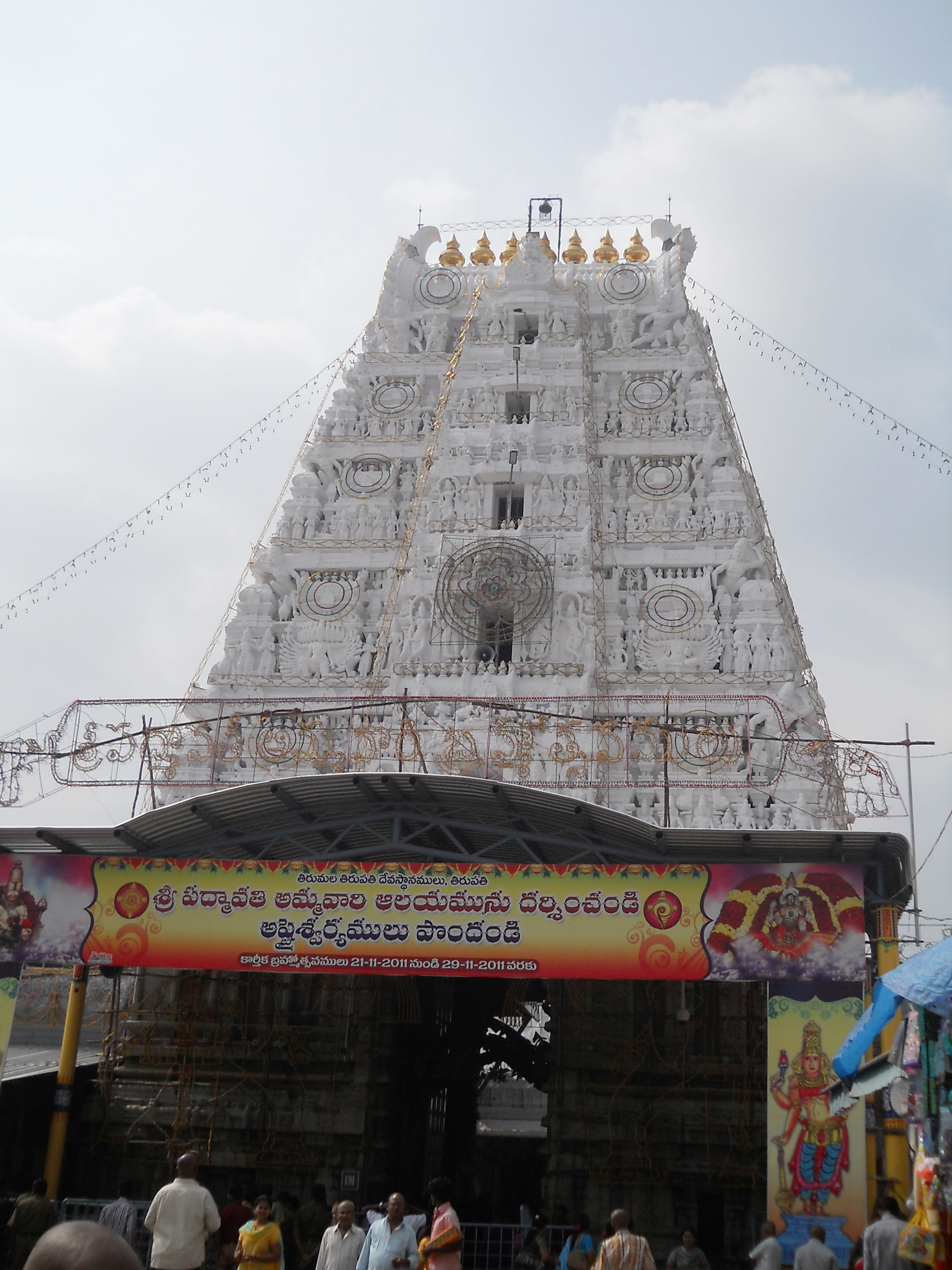
Padmavathi Temple

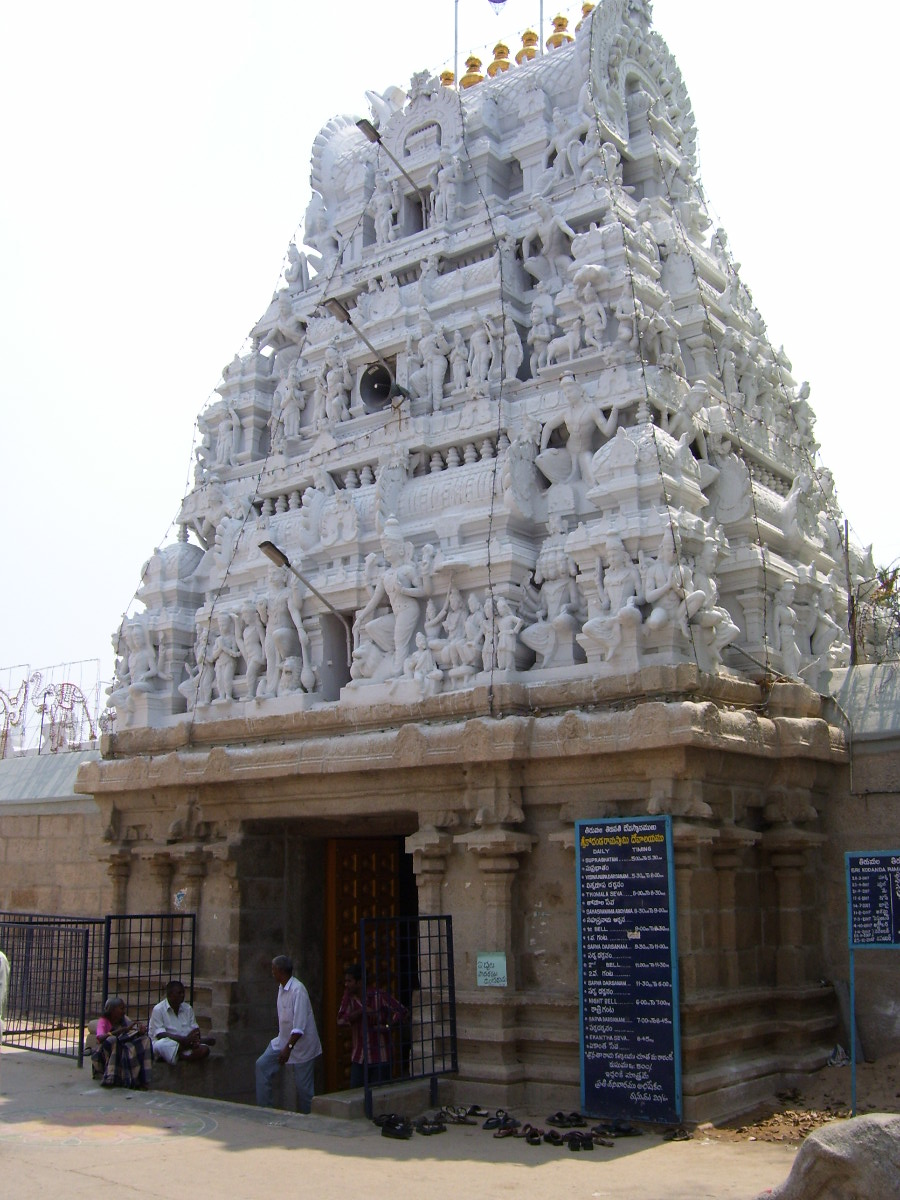
Kodandarama Temple

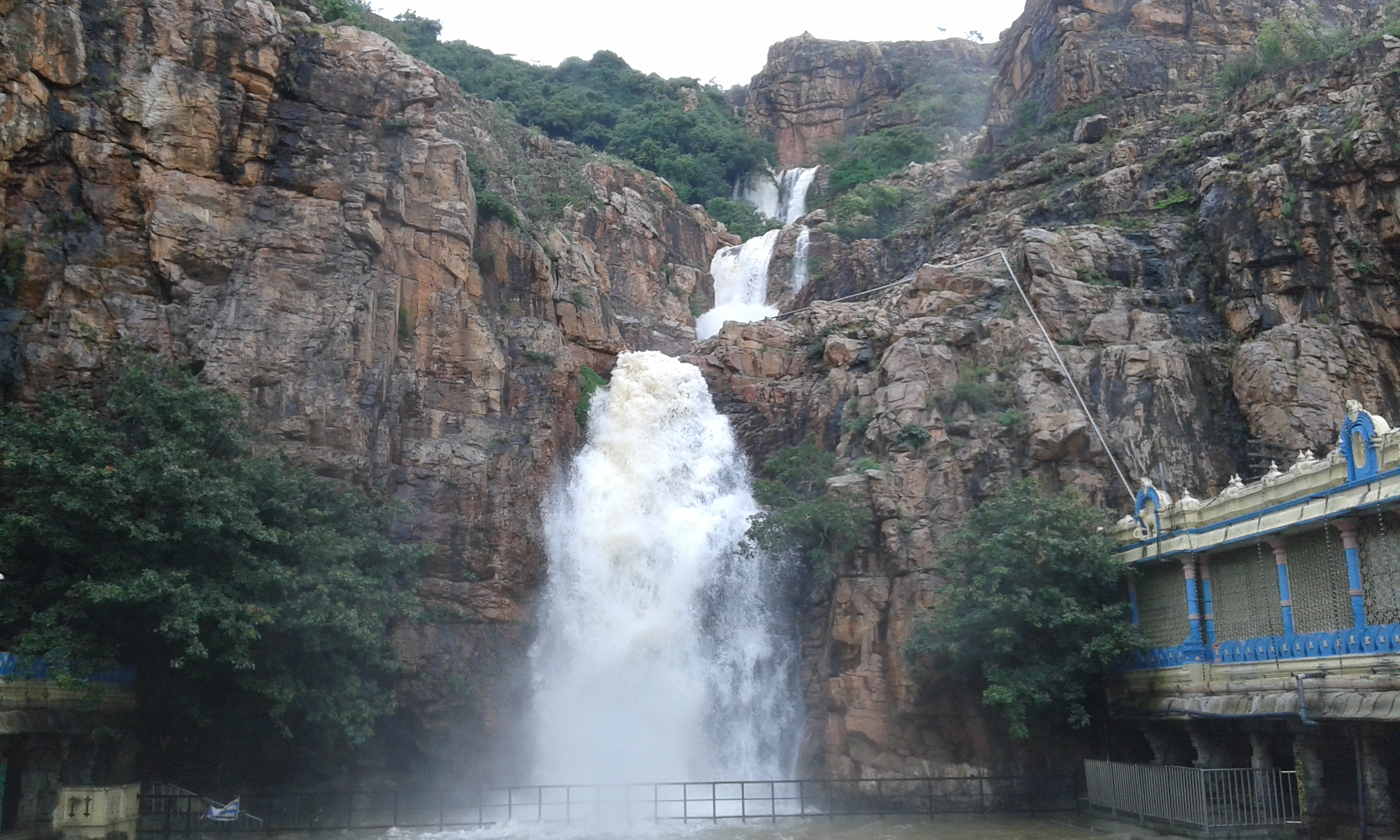
Kapila Theertham

=== Other landmarks ===
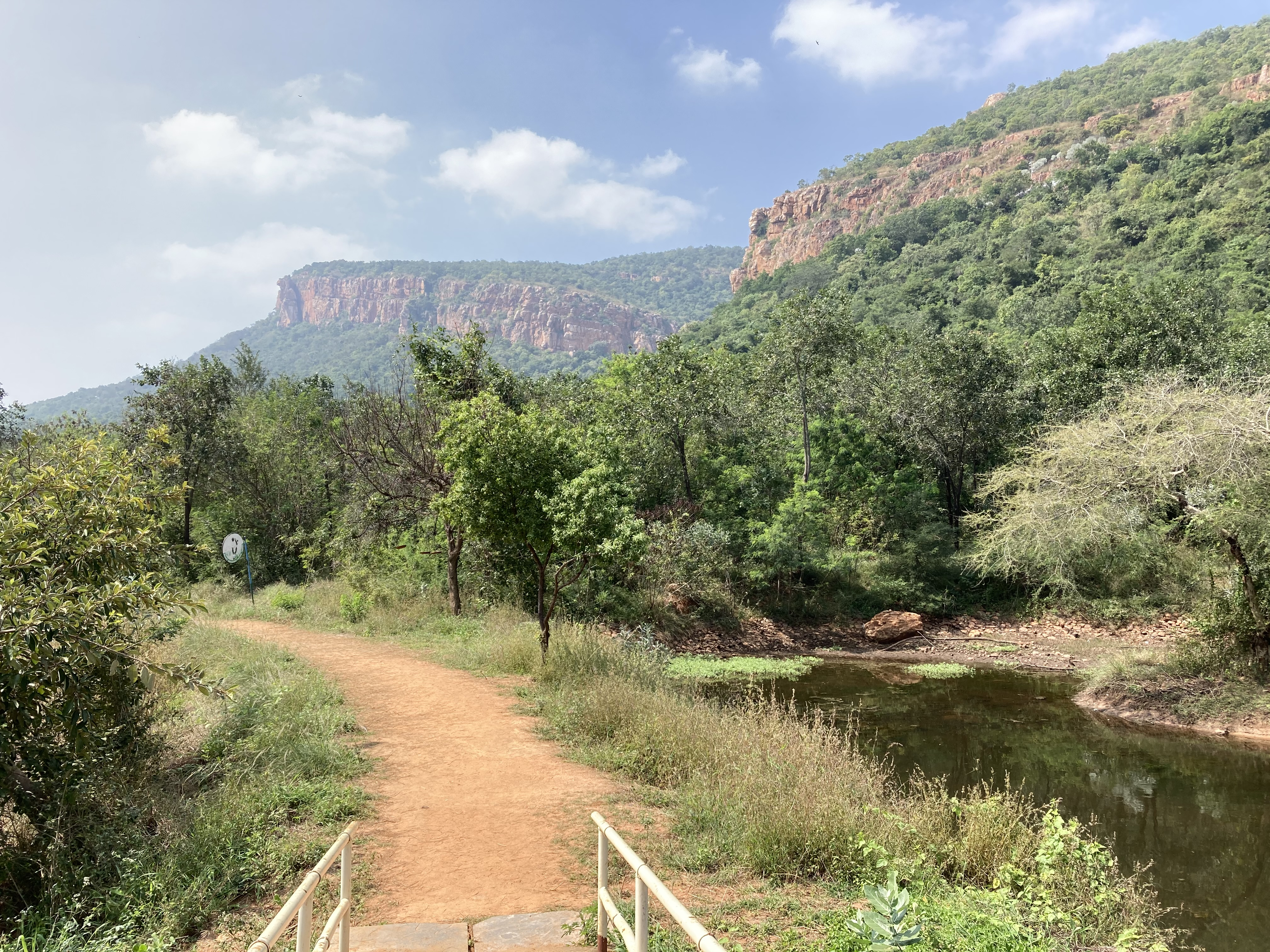
Divyaramam View

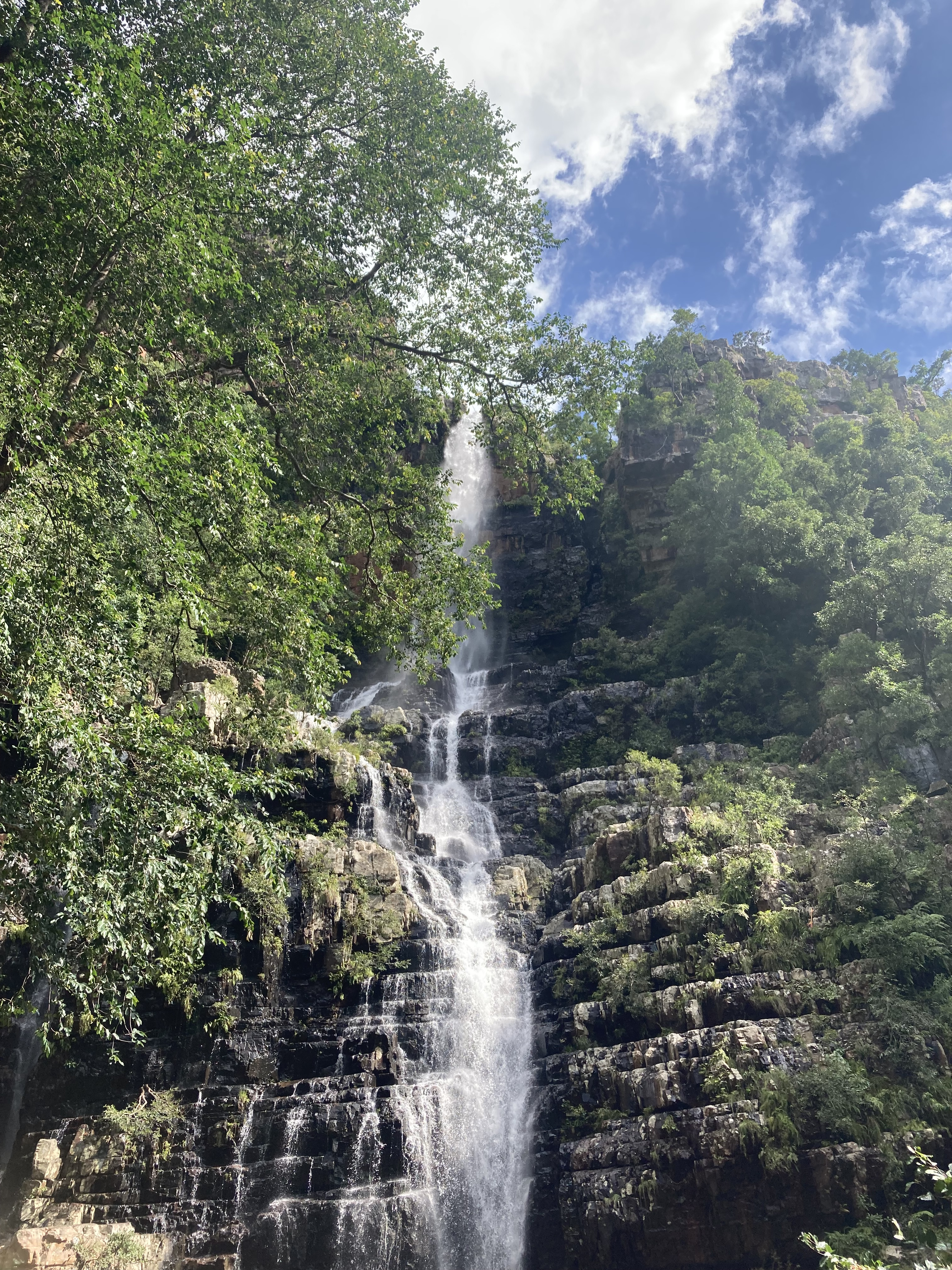
Talakona falls view

Besides historic temples, there are other tourist destinations in and around the city. Chandragiri Fort is a historical fort, built in the 11th century located in Chandragiri. The fort hosts an Archaeological Museum maintained by Archaeological Survey of India. Established in 1987, Sri Venkateswara Zoological Park in Tirupati is the largest zoo park in Asia, which covers an area of 5532 acres. Tirupati also hosts a Regional Science centre. A Space Exposition Hall, which has a digital Planetarium, the first of its kind in Andhra Pradesh, and an Innovation Space were added to this centre.

Other Places of interest in Tirupati

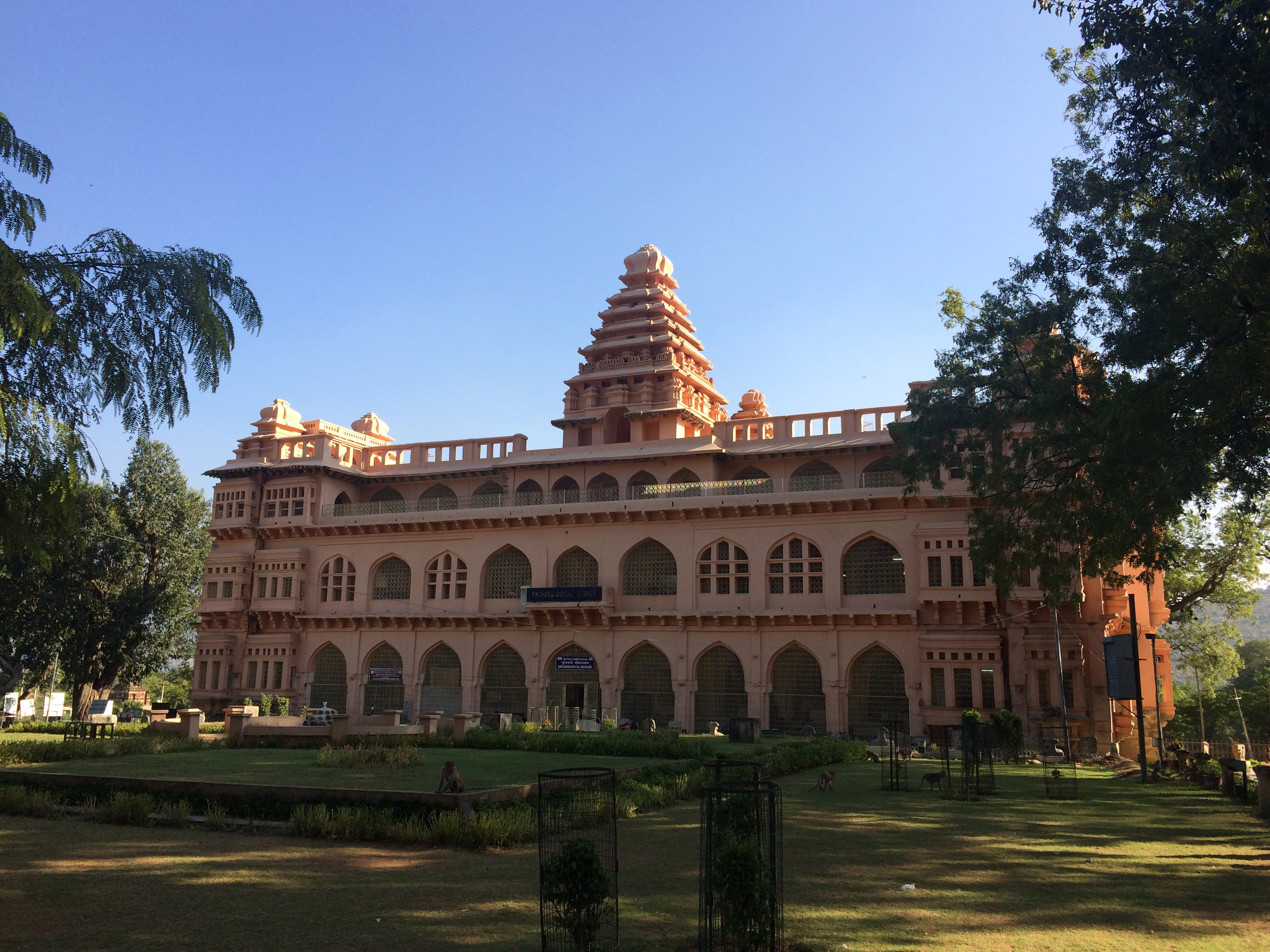
Chandragiri Fort

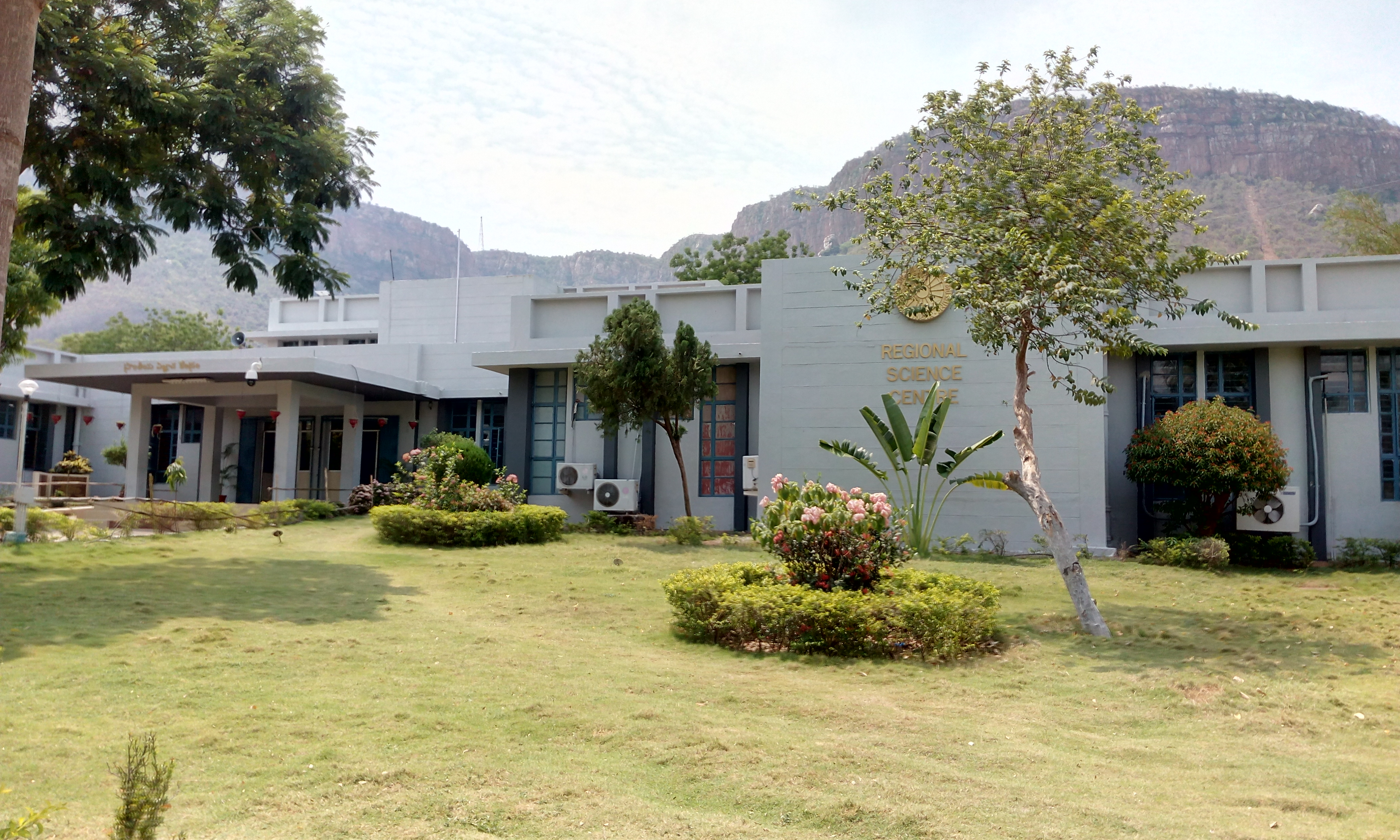
Regional Science Centre, Tirupati

=== Neighbourhoods ===
Tiruchanur, Alipiri, Chandragiri and Renigunta are the notable neighbourhoods of the city.

== Transport ==
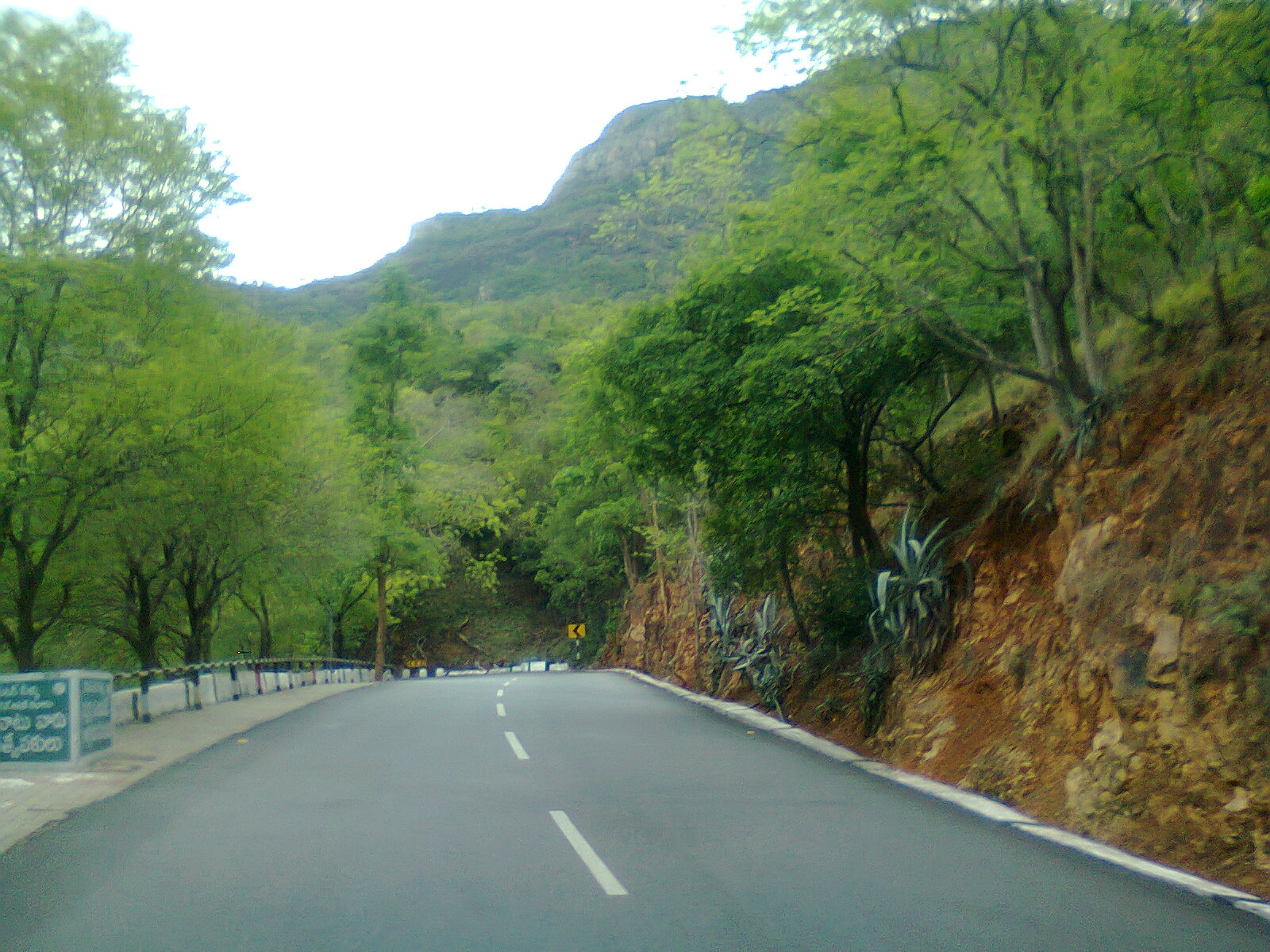
Tirupati Ghat Road

Sapthagiri Express bus of APSRTC

=== Roadways ===
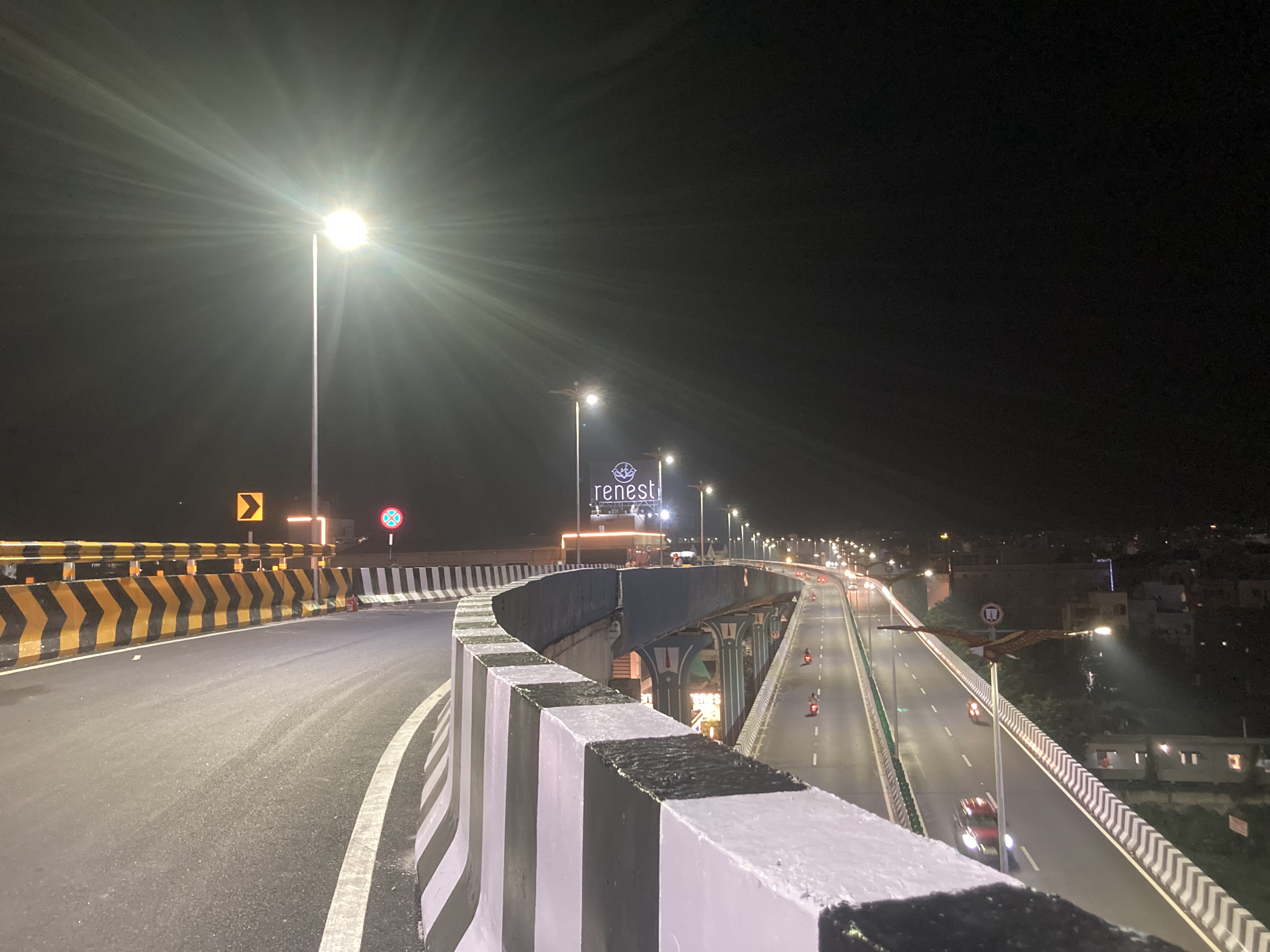
Srinivasa Sethu Flyover View

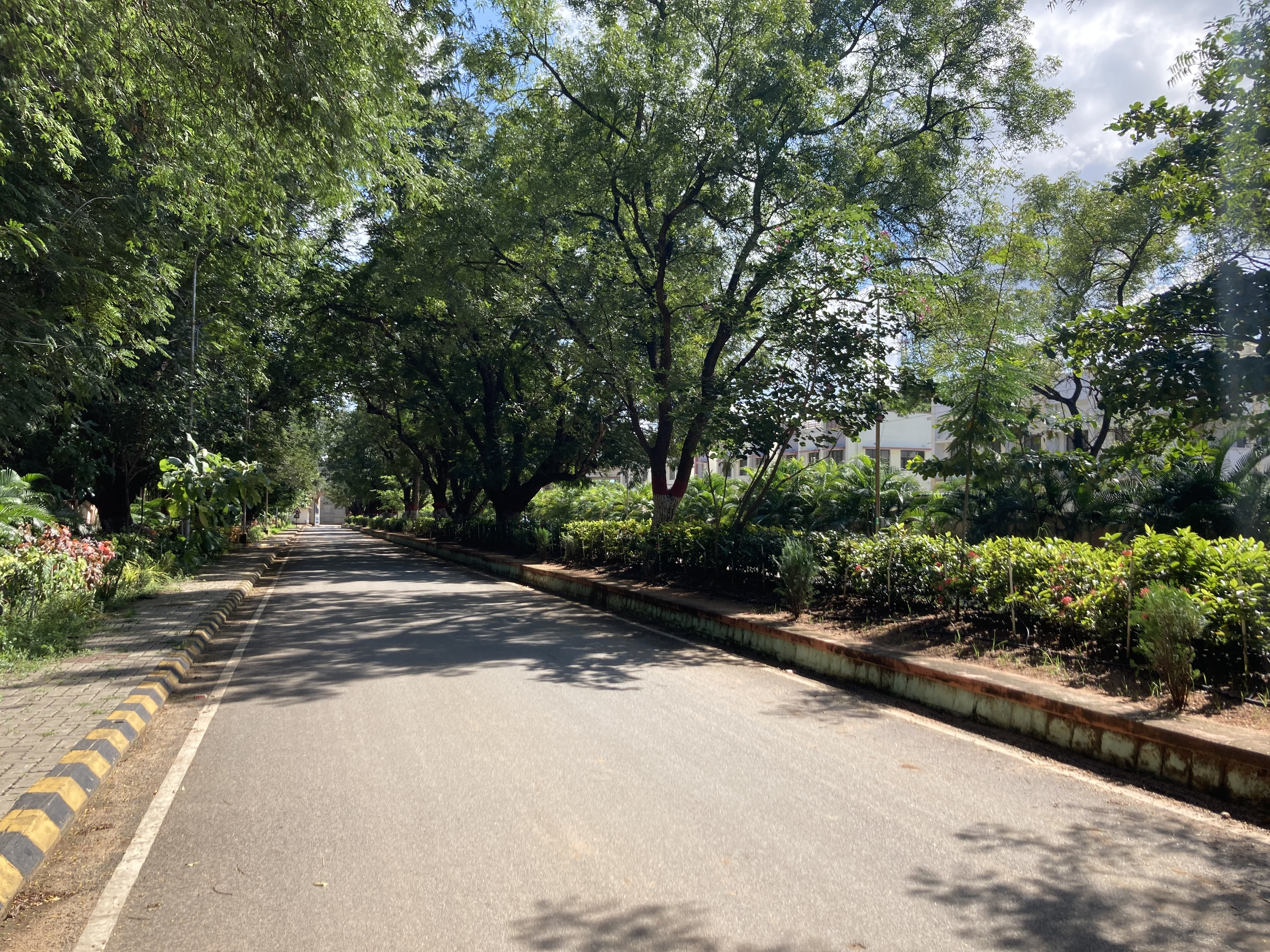
Veterinary University Road

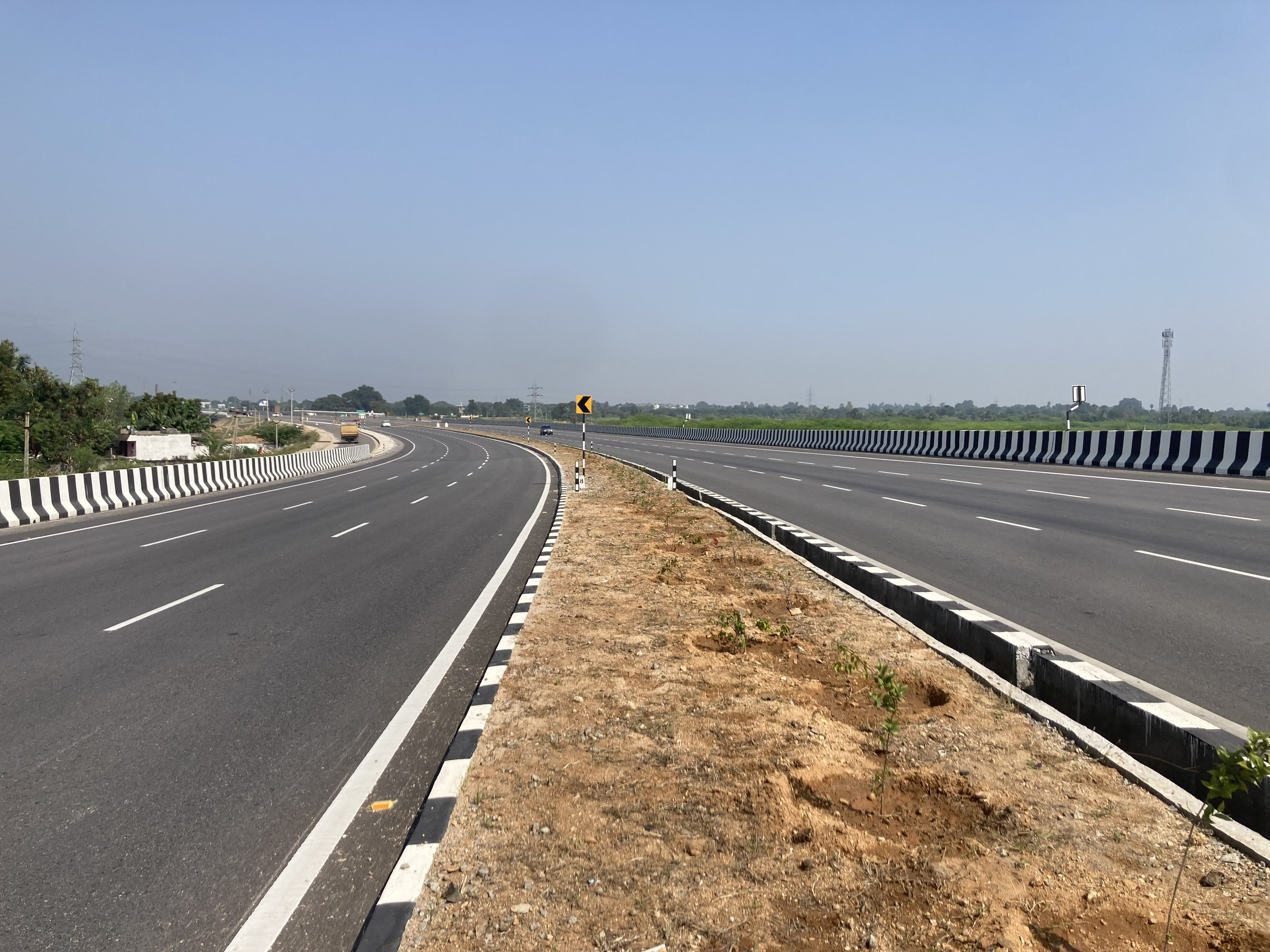
NH 140 near Tirupati

The city is well connected to major cities through national and state highways. National highways passing through Tirupati are National Highway 71 (which connects Madanapalle and Kadiri), and National Highway 140 connecting Tirupati with Puthalapattu. Within Tirupati Urban Development Authority Limits, there are two additional national highways, namely, NH 716 and NH 565. NH 716 connects Renigunta part of Tirupati to Chennai and Muddanur (via Kadapa and Rajampet). NH 565 on the other hand connects NH 71 to NH 65 - it starts from Yerpedu area of Tirupati and ends at Nakrekal in Nalgonda district.

There are two all-weather, asphalt ghat roads between Tirupati and Tirumala, one constructed in 1944 and the other in 1974. There is a total of 294.47 km (182.98 mi) of roads within the Tirupati Municipal Corporation limits.

=== Public transport ===
APSRTC is the state owned transport service, which operates buses to various destinations from Tirupati bus station complex. The bus station comprises three mini bus stations to various destinations, such as Srinivasa bus station for west-bound destinations, Sri Hari bus station for east bound destinations and Yedukondalu bus station is utilised for bus services to Tirumala. Balaji Link bus station at Alipiri is also used for bus services to Tirumala. Tirumala Tirupati Devasthanams runs free buses from the railway station and central bus stand to Alipiri for pilgrims. The buses to Tirumala are known as Sapthagiri Express.

Tirupati is in close proximity with the states of Karnataka and Tamil Nadu. Hence, direct buses from Tirumala to Chennai, Bengaluru, Jayanagar, Bangalore, Vellore, Kanchipuram are run by APSRTC Sapthagiri Express. KSRTC, TNSTC and SETC also operates their services to Lower Tirupati. There are also private transport which operate in the city.

=== Tirumala foot steps ===
There are two footpaths from Tirupati to Tirumala. These paths are called Sopanamargas and are mostly used by pilgrims. The first (and older) path starts from Alipiri and has 3550 steps, totalling 11 km (6.8 mi). At Alipiri there is a temple dedicated to Venkateswara called Padalamandapam. There are four Gopurams (temple towers) along the way. The other path, called Sri Vari Mettu starts from Srinivasa Mangapuram and is 6 km (3.7 mi) long. Both paths are completely roofed and pass through seven hills (part of Seshachalam Hills).

=== Railways ===
Tirupati has 6 railway stations. Tirupati Main is classified as an A1 station in the Guntakal railway division of South Central Railway zone. Tirupati West Halt and Tiruchanur are the satellite stations, used for decongesting rail traffic at the main station. In addition to these, Tirupati also has Chandragiri, Yerpedu and Renigunta Junction railway stations to serve the needs of the people of the city.

=== Airways ===
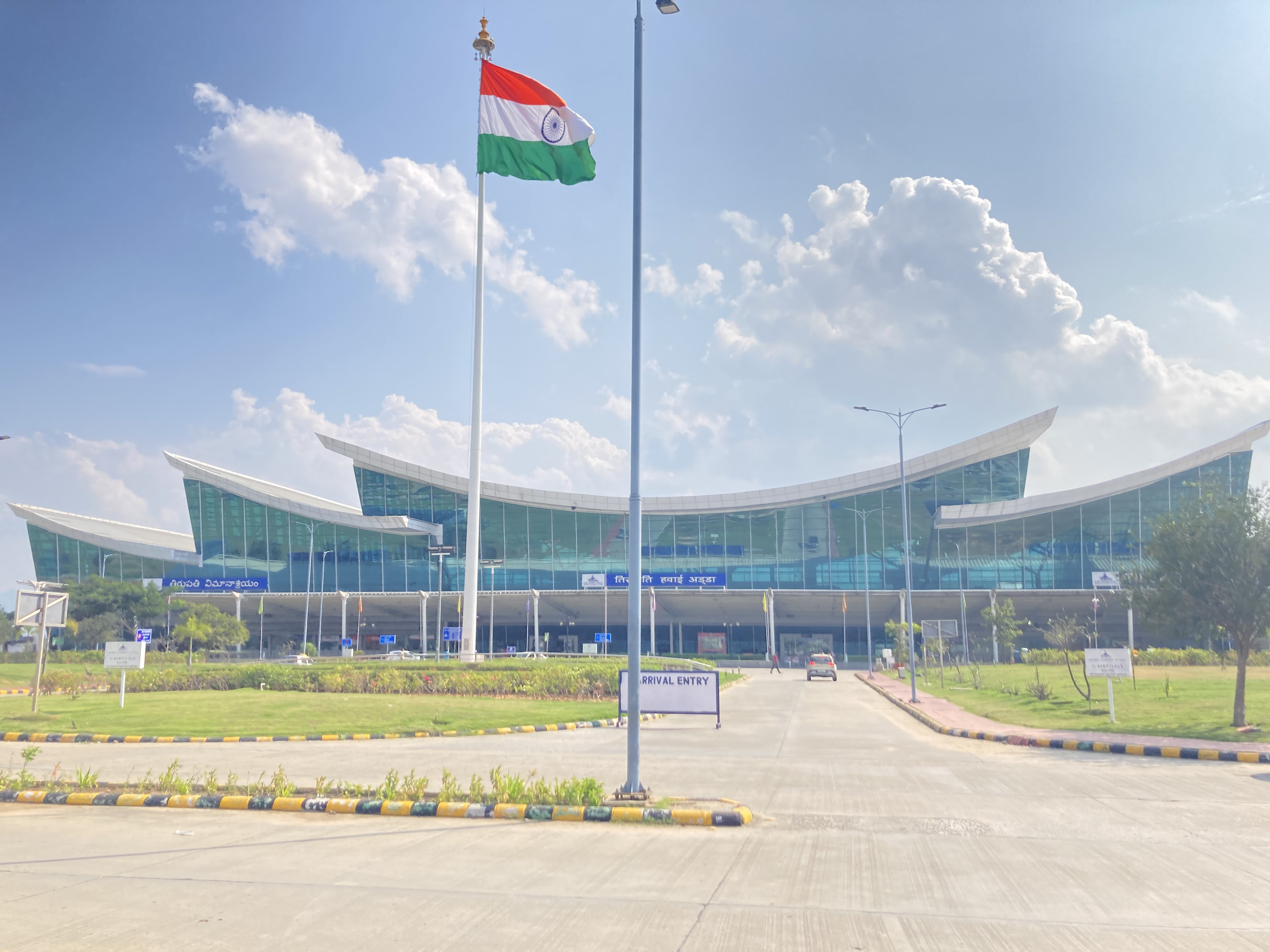
Tirupati Airport View

Tirupati Airport is located 15 km (9.3 mi) from the city centre and has daily flights to Coimbatore, Kolkata, Mumbai, New Delhi, Bangalore, Kolhapur, Pune, Tiruchirapalli, Madurai, Shirdi, Rajahmundry, Kalaburagi, Hubli, Vijayawada, Visakhapatnam and Hyderabad. The other closest international airport is Chennai International Airport which is 130 km (81 mi) from Tirupati. Tirupati Airport is being upgraded to an international airport. The new terminal was inaugurated on 22 October 2015.

== Education ==
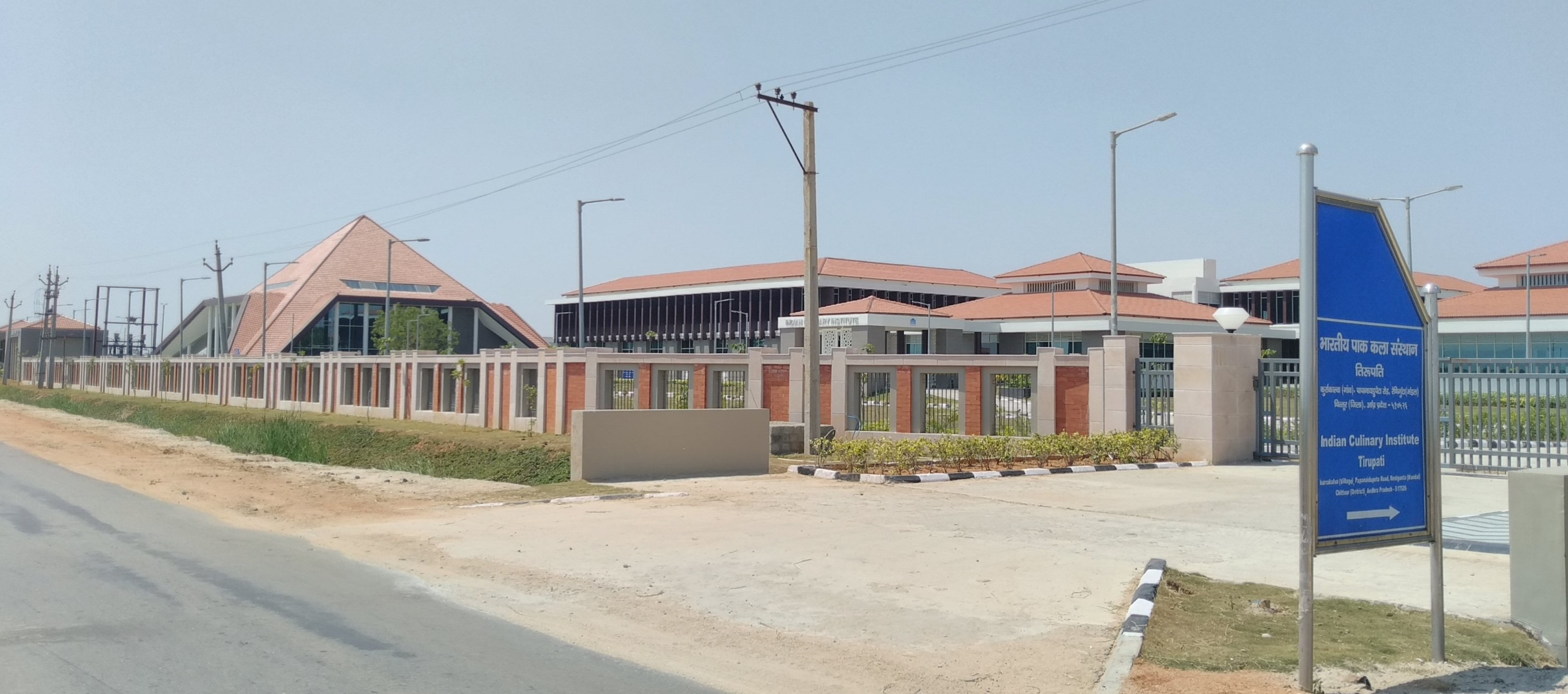
ICI Tirupati

The primary and secondary school education is imparted by government, aided and private schools of the School Education Department of the state. Majority of them are named after presiding deity of Tirupati temple, Venkateswara and his consort goddess Padmavati.

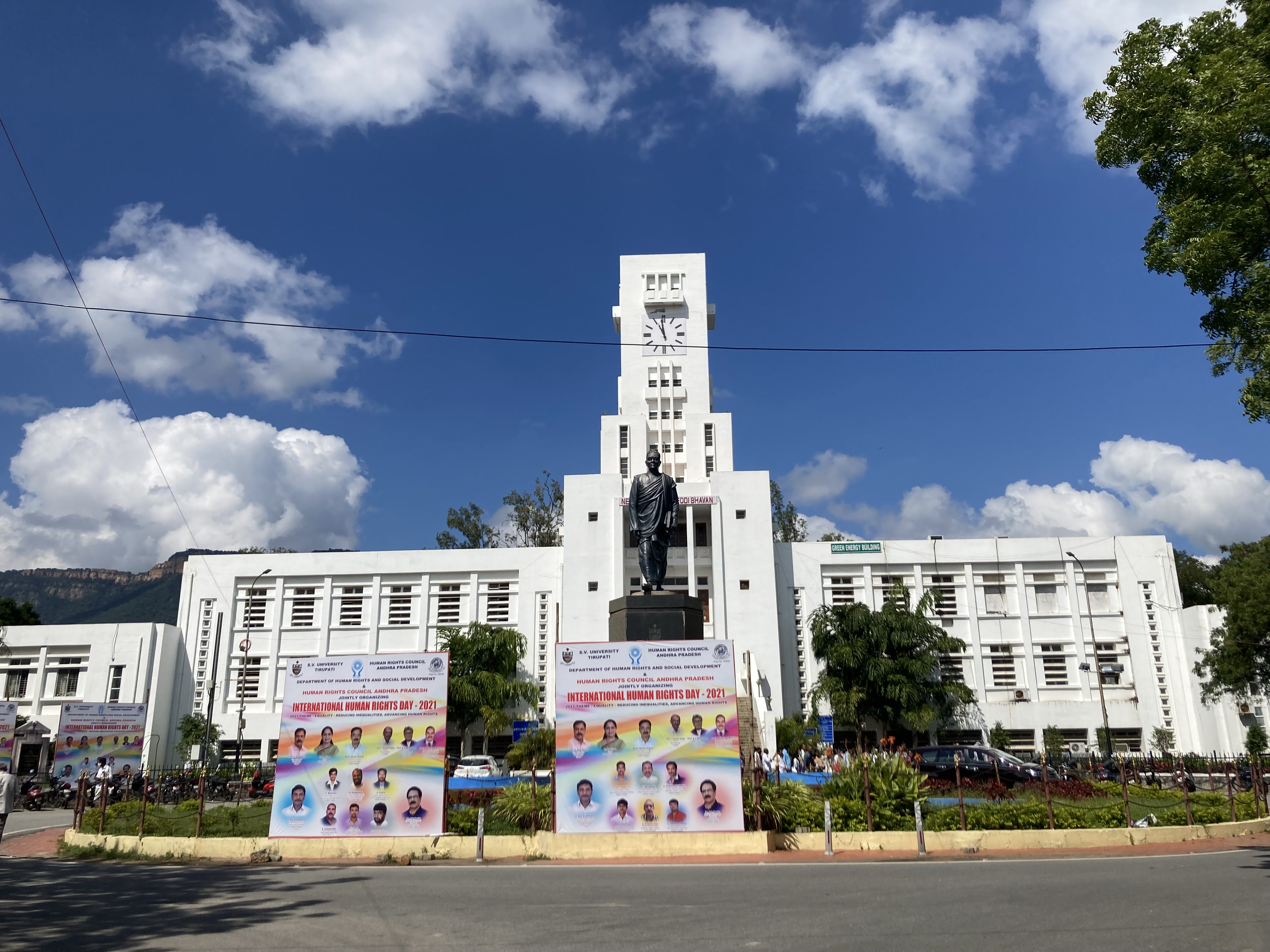
SVU Admin Building

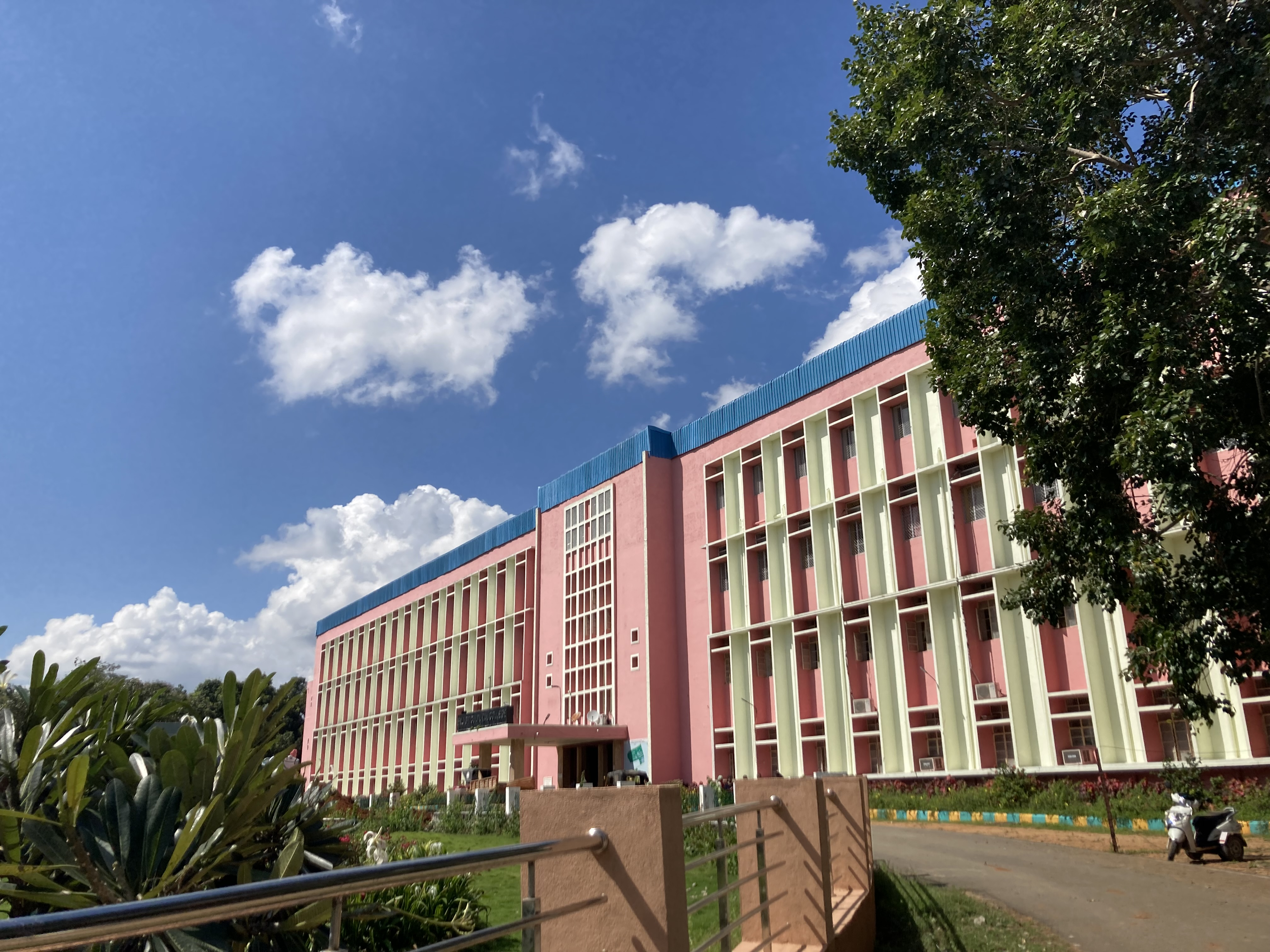
S V Agricultural College Tirupati

There are several universities and colleges including state government and Tirumala Tirupati Devasthanam sponsored such as, Sri Venkateswara University, established in 1954; Sri Padmavati Mahila Visvavidyalayam, a dedicated women's university; Medical colleges include Sri Venkateswara Medical College and Sri Padmavathi Medical College for Women. Sri Venkateswara Institute of Medical Sciences (SVIMS) is also a medical institute, Sri Venkateswara Vedic University to preserve, foster and promote oral traditions of Vedic, Agamic and Cognate Literature, with focus on right intonations. Rashtriya Sanskrit Vidyapeetha, a university established for higher learning in Sanskrit studies, Traditional Sastras and Pedagogy. Sri Venkateswara Veterinary University to strengthen education and services in the fields of Veterinary Science, Dairy Technology and Fishery Science in the State of Andhra Pradesh. Sri Venkateswara Institute of Traditional Sculpture and Architecture (SVITSA) run by TTD is one of the two institutions in India offering courses in traditional sculpture and architecture to students. Seven diploma courses are offered in subjects such as temple architecture, stone sculpture, Sudai aculpture, metal sculpture, wood sculpture, traditional painting and traditional Kalamkari art. Indian Culinary Institute, Tirupati is the first culinary institute in India established by Ministry of Tourism (India).

The city has Indian Institutes of Science Education and Research (IISER) and IIT Tirupati which were allotted by Government of India to the state of Andhra Pradesh. Sri Venkateswara College of Law is a notable law college in Tirupati.

The city also has a large number of private schools such as Candor National Public School.

== Research ==
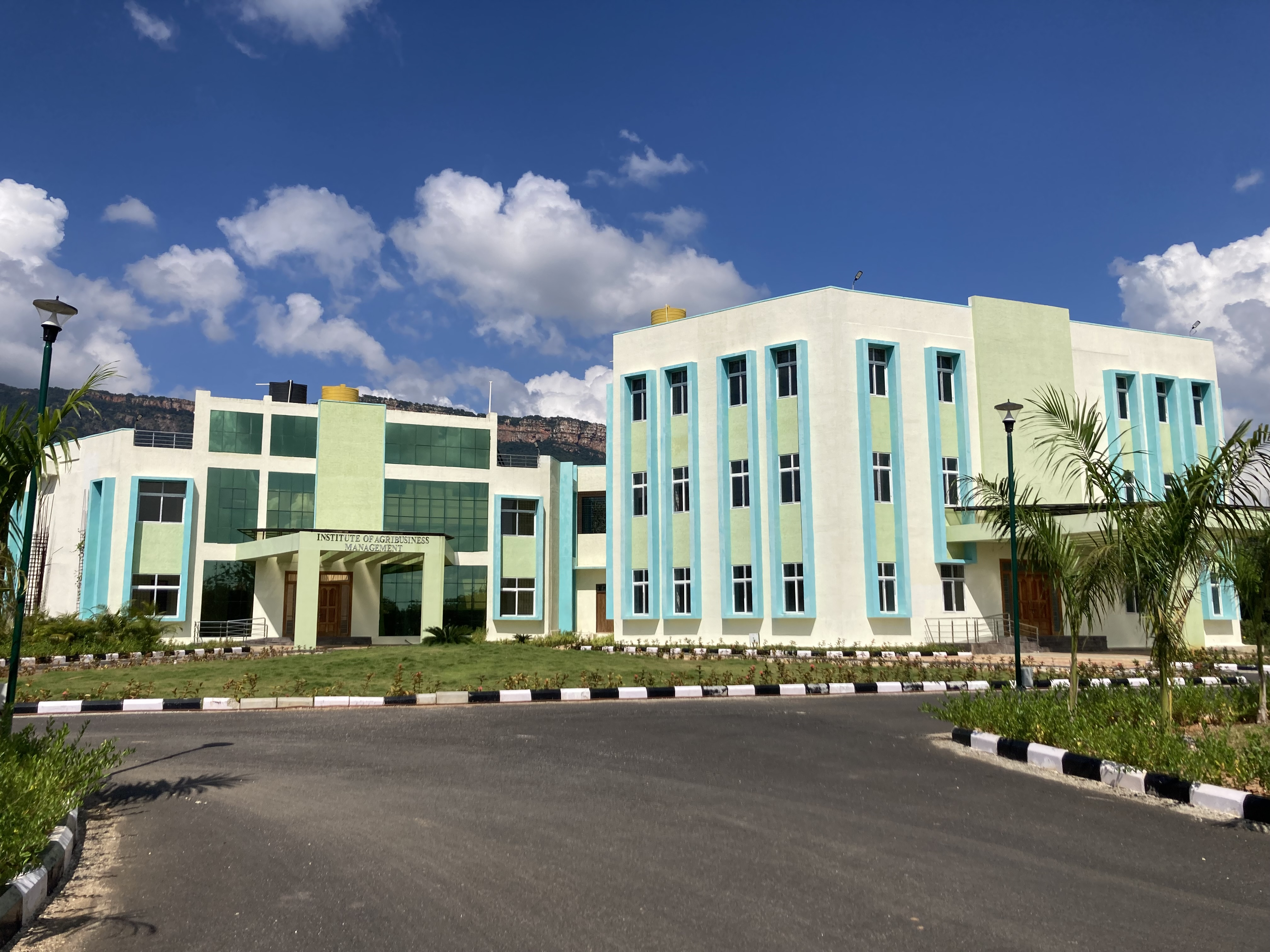
Institute Of Agri Business Management, Tirupati

- The National Atmospheric Research Laboratory (NARL) is an autonomous research institute funded by the Department of Space of the Government of India. NARL is engaged in fundamental and applied research in the field of atmospheric sciences. It is around 30 km (19 mi) from Tirupati.
- Sri Venkateswara Medical College, Tirupati is selected for establishment of Multidisciplinary Research Units (MRUs) and Model Rural Health Research Units (MRHRU) by the Indian Council of Medical Research (ICMR).
- Indian Institute of Science Education and Research, Tirupati. It has been established by the Ministry of Human Resource Development, in order to promote Higher Scientific Learning and Research as well as Scientific Exploration at the Undergraduate and Postgraduate levels of education and to create Scientists and Academics. IISER Tirupati is recognised as an Institute of National Importance by the Government of India. This new institute started functioning from the 2015 academic year in the month of August.
- Indian Institute of Technology Tirupati. IIT Tirupati offers a 4-year Bachelor of Technology (B.Tech.) along with 2-years Master of Science (M.Sc.) Master of Science (M.S.), Master of Technology (M.Tech. - started in 2018), Master of Public Policy (MPP) & Doctor of Philosophy (Ph.D.) programmes in several engineering, science and humanities fields .
- Sri Venkateswara Institute of Medical Sciences (SVIMS), Tirupati is selected for establishment of college level Viral Diagnostic Research Labs.
- A sub-centre for All India Coordinated Research Project (AICRP) on the groundnut (peanut) is established at the Regional Agricultural Research Station (RARS), Tirupati to conduct research activities on new high. The research will help to meet the needs of the country's 100 arid districts which receive less than 500 mm (20 in) rainfall. RARS has so far developed 12 groundnut varieties.
- A research centre for indigenous cows was established by TTD at its dairy farm named Sri Venkateswara Gosamrakshanashala. The purpose of the centre is to protect the cows and also to share the rare breeds among similar organisations. The Gosamrakshanashala already had distinctive high-worth breeds like Ongole, while it is also trying to gather Sahiwal breed of cows from Punjab, Gir cows of Gujarat to the centre, Tharparker and Kankrej cows from Karnataka.

== Media ==
Sri Venkateswara Bhakti Channel (SVBC), the first 24-hour Telugu devotional TV channel dedicated to broadcast Hindu devotional programmes is telecast from Tirupati.

Started in 1949, Sapthagiri is a spiritual monthly magazine based at Tirupati and published in Telugu, Sanskrit, Hindi, English, Tamil and Kannada languages. Both SVBC and Sapthagiri are run by Tirumala Tirupati Devasthanams.

Telugu newspapers Andhra Bhoomi, Saakshi, Eenadu, Vaartha, Andhra Jyothi, and Andhra Prabha; and English newspapers Deccan Chronicle, The Hindu, Indian Express, Times of India, and The Hans India are available in the city. The Hindu, Sakshi, Andhra Jyothi, Eenadu and other dailies have their printing and publication offices set up here.

Tirupati has All India Radio station and is served by FM stations 92.7 Big FM, 93.5 Red FM, and E-FM 104.

== See also ==
- Tirupati district
- List of municipal corporations in Andhra Pradesh
- List of urban agglomerations in Andhra Pradesh
- List of Hindu temples in Tirupati
- Pullaiahgaripalli
- Tirumala Tirupati Devasthanams
- Tirupati Urban Development Authority
- Tirupati Municipal Corporation
- Tirupati Ganga Jatara
