= Agam =

Agam may refer to:

- Agam (band), a Bangalore-based band
- Agam Regency, a regency of West Sumatra, Indonesia
- AGAM, the Hebrew acronym for the Operations Directorate in the Israeli Defense forces

== People ==
- Agam Darshi (born 1987), British-Canadian actress
- Agam Gev (born 2008), Israeli rhythmic gymnast
- Agam Rudberg (born 1986), Israeli actress and model
- Agam Singh Giri (1927–1971), Indian poet
- Agam Singh Rai, (fl. 1770s), Nepalese politician
- Agam Wispi (1930–2003), Indonesian poet
- Yaacov Agam (1928–2026), Israeli artist

== See also ==
- Jain Agamas, texts of Śvetāmbara Jainism
- Āgama (Buddhism), a collection of scriptures
- Agama (disambiguation)
- Agame, a historical region of Ethiopia
- Agham (disambiguation)
