= Ashtabhuja =

Iconographic form of eight-armed deities in Hinduism

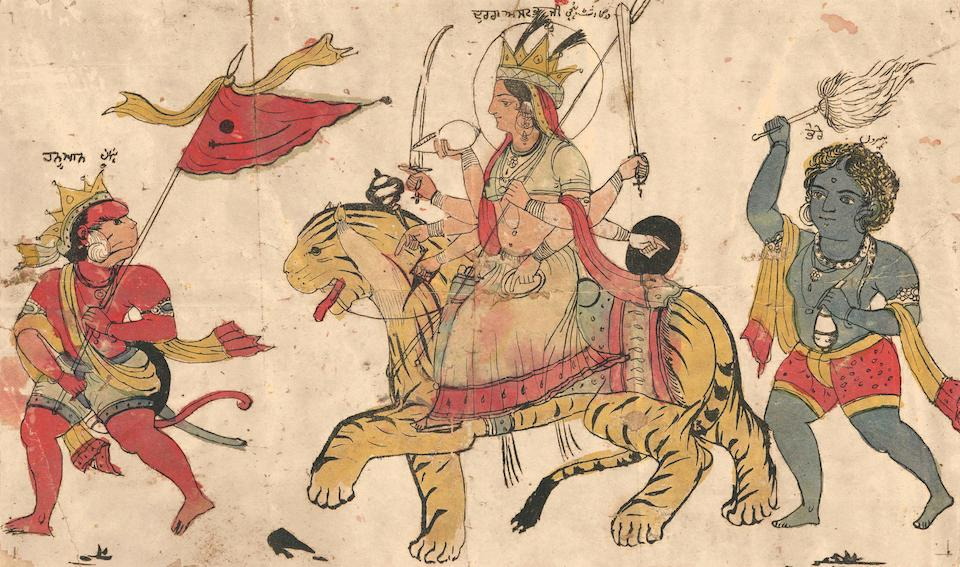
Punjabi woodcut showing Durga riding a tiger in procession with Hanuman and Bhairava (northwestern India, 19th century).

Ashtabhuja (Sanskrit: अष्टभुजा, romanized: Aṣṭabhujā, lit. 'eight-armed') is an iconographic form in Hinduism characterized by deities depicted with eight arms. This multi-armed depiction is especially associated with certain manifestations of the Great Goddess such as Durga, as well as specific forms of male deities like Vishnu.

== Etymology and definition ==
The term ashtabhuja is derived from the Sanskrit components aṣṭa (eight) and bhujā (arm/armed). In modern scholarship the word functions both as a descriptive art-historical label for eight-armed sculptures - for example, an “ashtabhuja” bronze mūrti – and as a specific technical name or epithet for deities in textual and ritual contexts.

== Iconography and symbolism ==
The eight arms of an ashtabhuja deity typically hold a variety of āyudhas (weapons) and emblems that signify divine power. Prescriptive texts and iconographic studies describe eight-armed forms of Durga holding items such as a śaṅkha (conch), cakra (discus), dhanu (bow), bāṇa or śara (arrow), khaḍga (sword), khetaka (shield), śūla or triśūla (trident), and a pāśa (noose). Certain forms may also display hand gestures such as the boon-granting varada mudrā or threatening tarjanī mudrā, alongside additional weapons like an aṅkuśa (elephant goad).

Modern political and cultural analyses note that in some twentieth- and twenty-first-century contexts, the eight arms of a constructed goddess named Ashtabhuja are interpreted symbolically as coordinating multiple virtues and domains – for example, patience and aggression, intellect, science, and wealth.

== Deities ==
=== Durga and her manifestations ===
Scholars note that Durga is frequently depicted in an eight-armed form in textual prescriptions and sculptural programs. Specific manifestations such as Vana-Durga and Agni-Durga are described in the literature as eight-armed goddesses, holding a standard set of weapons in each hand. A notable Gupta-period bronze mūrti from Deulbari has been identified by scholars as an eight-armed goddess named Sarvvani, interpreted as a form of Parvati or Gauri.

=== Vaishno Devi ===
Iconographic and textual studies of Vaishno Devi describe her as an ashtabhuja form of the Great Goddess, understood as an embodiment of the Tridevi. In these depictions the goddess holds multiple weapons associated with both Vishnu and Shiva, underscoring her composite and pan-sectarian character.

=== Vishnu ===
The Bhagavata Purana is cited in art-historical scholarship as mentioning an eight-armed form of Vishnu, invoked by Daksha as “Ashtabhuja-Nārāyaṇa”. This reference is interpreted as evidence for the early development of Vaishnava mythology in which a multi-armed Nārāyaṇa embodies multiple powers simultaneously.

=== Ashtabhuja as a modern goddess ===
Studies of Hindu nationalist women's organizations note that the Rashtra Sevika Samiti venerates a modern goddess explicitly named Ashtabhuja. This goddess is depicted as a warrior figure with weapons in each of her eight hands and is presented as an integral combination of Mahakali, Mahasaraswati, and Mahalakshmi.

== Regional and temple traditions ==
Regional traditions preserve the importance of eight-armed forms in specific locales. In the Kanchi region, art-historical research suggests that the Pallava dynasty may have constructed a temple dedicated to an eight-armed Nārāyaṇa, referred to as “Attapuyakaram” (Ashtabhuja) by the early Āḻvār saint Pey. The Gupta-period bronze image of the eight-armed goddess Sarvvani from Deulbari in present-day Bangladesh is another significant example discussed in the scholarship on early Hindu iconography.

== In texts and worship ==
The iconography of ashtabhuja forms is closely tied to Āgamic and Purāṇic prescriptions. The Suprabhedāgama is cited in secondary literature as detailing an eight-armed form of Durga, describing her carrying eight distinct weapons, standing on a lotus pedestal, and either standing upon the head of the buffalo demon Mahisha or riding a lion. The Viṣṇudharmottara Purāṇa uses this eight-armed configuration as a foundational type, adding two hands to describe a ten-armed form in later passages. The Bhāgavata Purāṇa reference to Ashtabhuja Nārāyaṇa provides theological grounding for eight-armed male deities within Vaishnava devotional and ritual contexts.

== Gallery ==
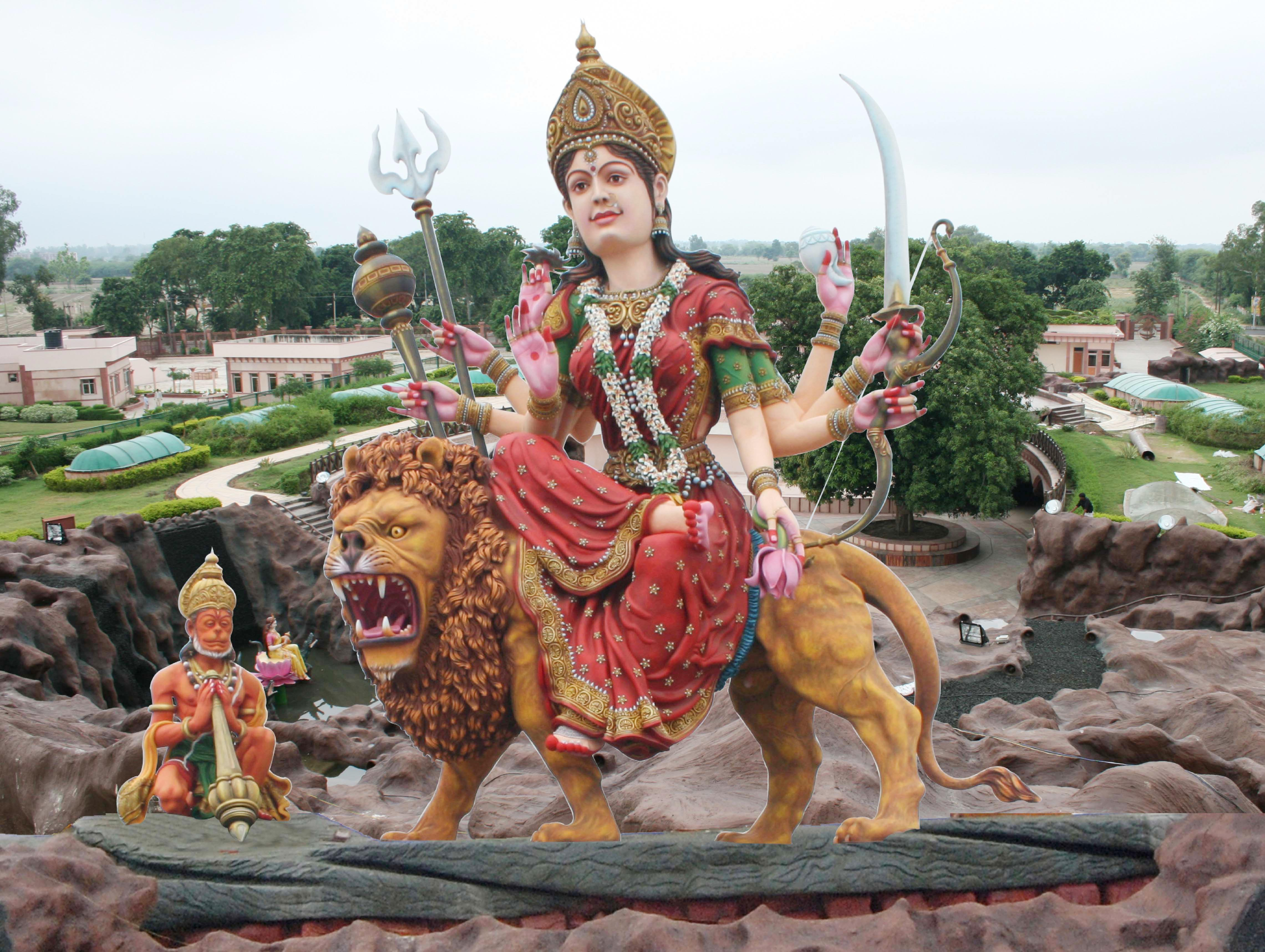
Eight-armed form of Vaishno Devi at Vrindavan Vaishno Devi Dham.

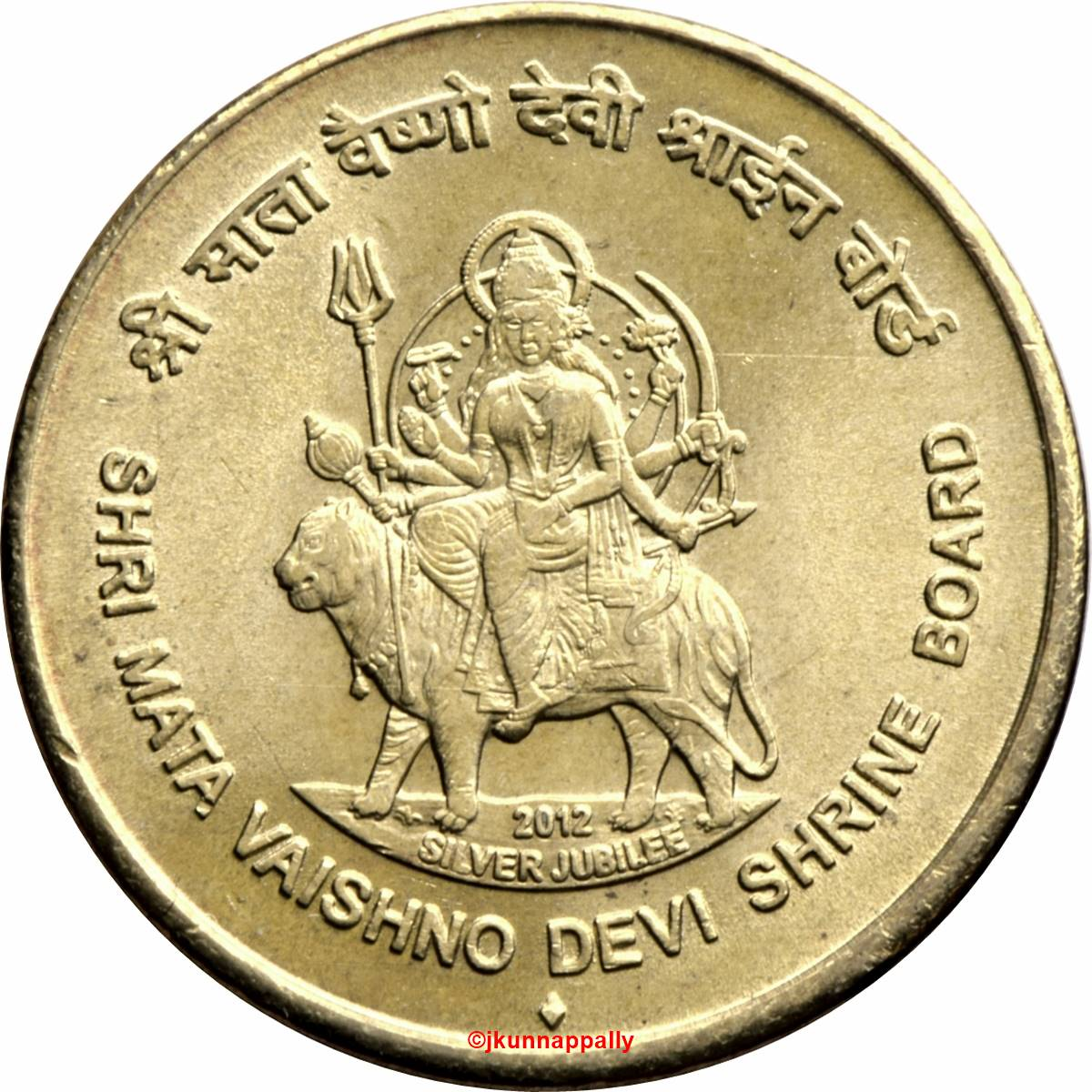
Eight-armed Vaishno Devi depicted on a commemorative coin.

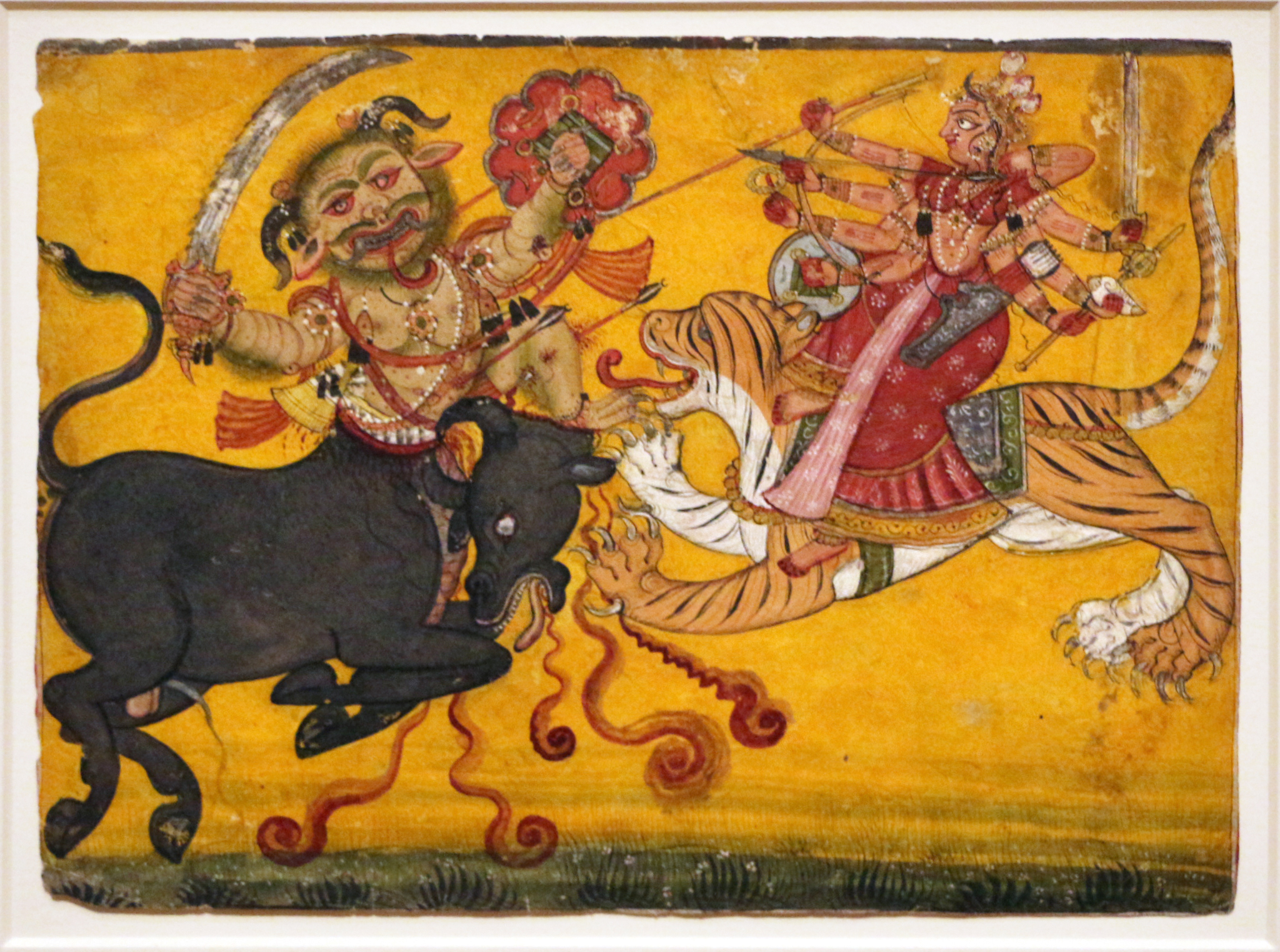
Eight-armed Durga slaying the buffalo demon Mahishasura (Nurpur, Himachal Pradesh, c. 1700–1710).

== See Also ==
- Chaturbhuja – Hindu iconography of four-armed deities
- Hecatoncheires – Greek mythological giants with 50 heads and 100 arms
