= Swami Pushkarini =

- Srivari Pushkarini
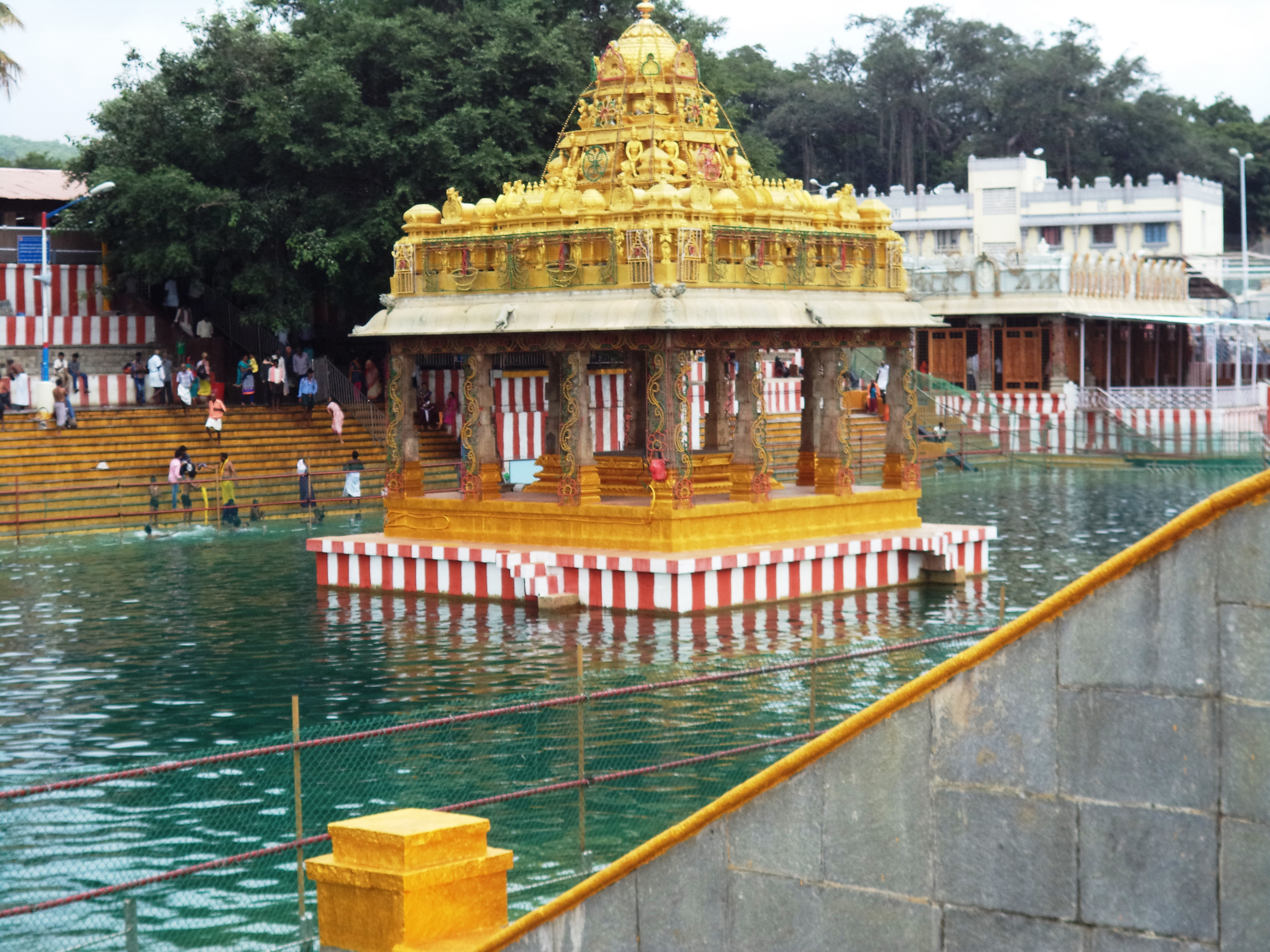
- Interactive map of Swami Pushkarini
- Location: northern side of Srivari Temple,Tirumala
- Coordinates: 13.684414°N 79.347967°E
- Type: Divine Tank
- Built: 1468

Swami Pushkarini is a sacred temple tank located in Tirumala, Andhra Pradesh, India. Situated adjacent to the Venkateswara Temple, Tirumala, the tank covers approximately 1.5 acres and plays a central role in temple rituals, including the annual Teppotsavam (Float Festival) and the Chakrasnanam during the Brahmotsavams. Pilgrims traditionally take a holy dip in its waters, which are believed to cleanse sins, before entering the main temple for darshan.

It is customary to take a bath in this pushkarini near the Srivari temple and go to the darshan of the Lord. When Lord Venkateswara descended from Vaikuntam to Kaliyuga Vaikuntam Tirumalakonda, it is believed that this is the theertham that the Lord himself brought to the earth from Vaikuntam for his water sports. Swami Pushkarini is known as the destroyer of all sins. It is said that Subrahmanya Swamy, who killed Tarakasura and was killed by Brahma, also took a bath in this pushkarini and got rid of the sin. According to the Varaha Purana, Lord Varaha himself explained to Bhudevi that all the tirthas in the three worlds are converging in the Lord Pushkarini. Devotees believe that on the day of Dwadashi in the month of Dhanur, all the three tirthas flow into the Lord Pushkarini. It is to be noted that the Brahmotsavams will end only after the holy chakra snan in the Swami Pushkarini.

== History ==
The tank is built in 1468 by Saluva King Narasimha Raya

== Closure ==
Every year Swami Pushkarini is closed for a month for Annual Maintenance and repair for Annual Srivari Brahmotsavams.

TTD Water Works Department repairs the flooring , repairs the pipes and fills the Pushkarini with water.

In 2026, Swami Pushkarini is closed from 1st August to September 10th for annual maintenance and repairs

== Gallery ==
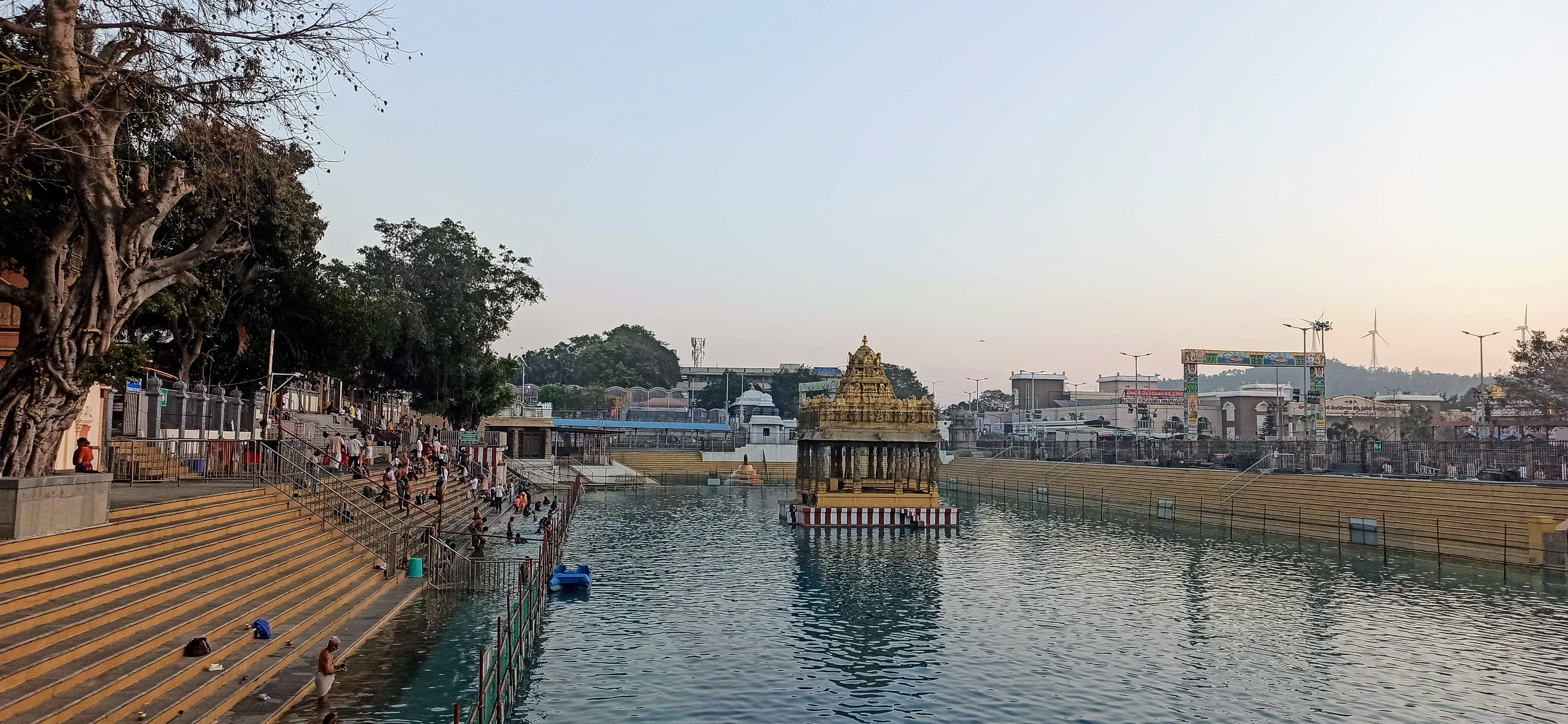
Swami Pushkarini

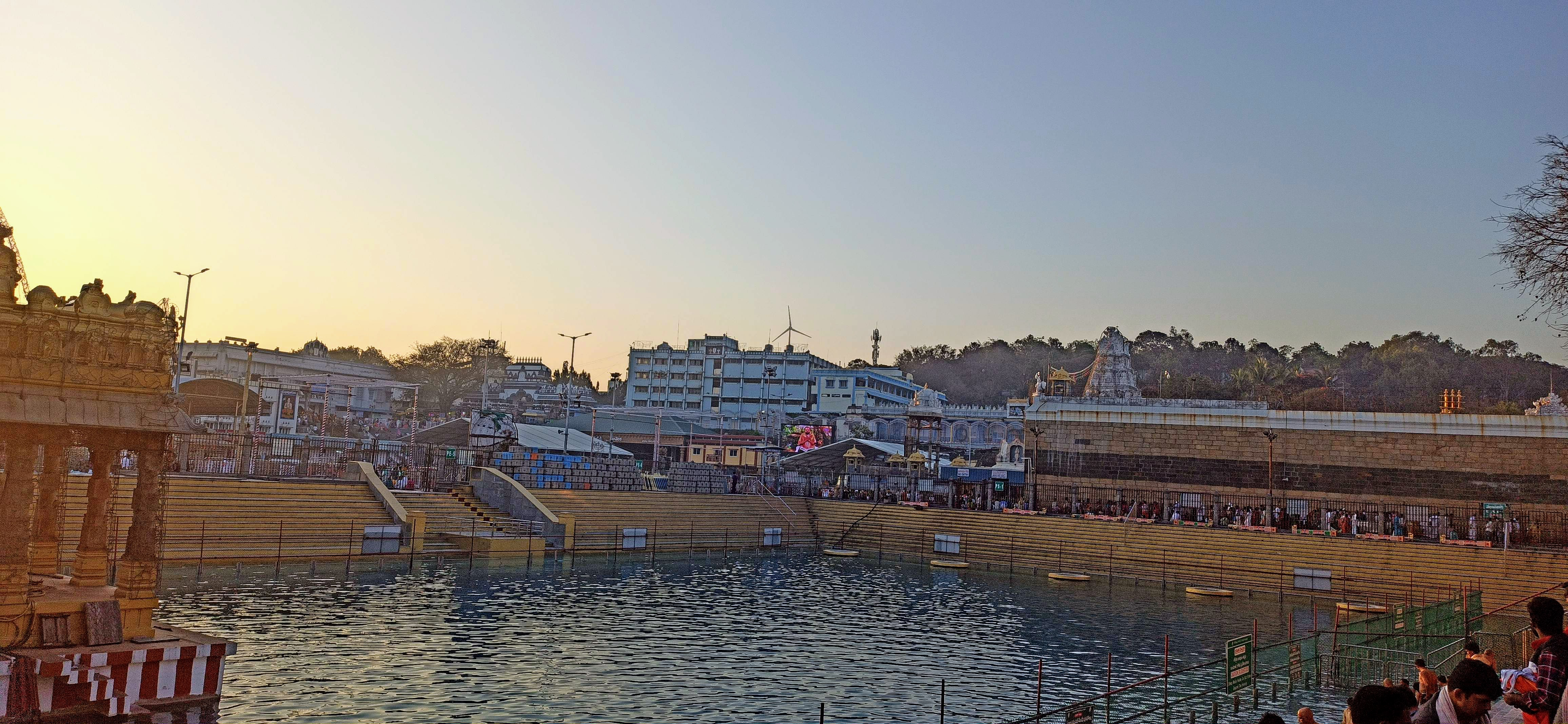
Swami Pushkarini
