= Buddam =

Buddam may refer to:

- Buddam, India, a village in Andhra Pradesh, India
- Buddam (unit), a unit of mass used in the pearl trade in Mumbai (formerly Bombay) in the 19th century
