= Adimurti =

Form of Hindu deity Vishnu

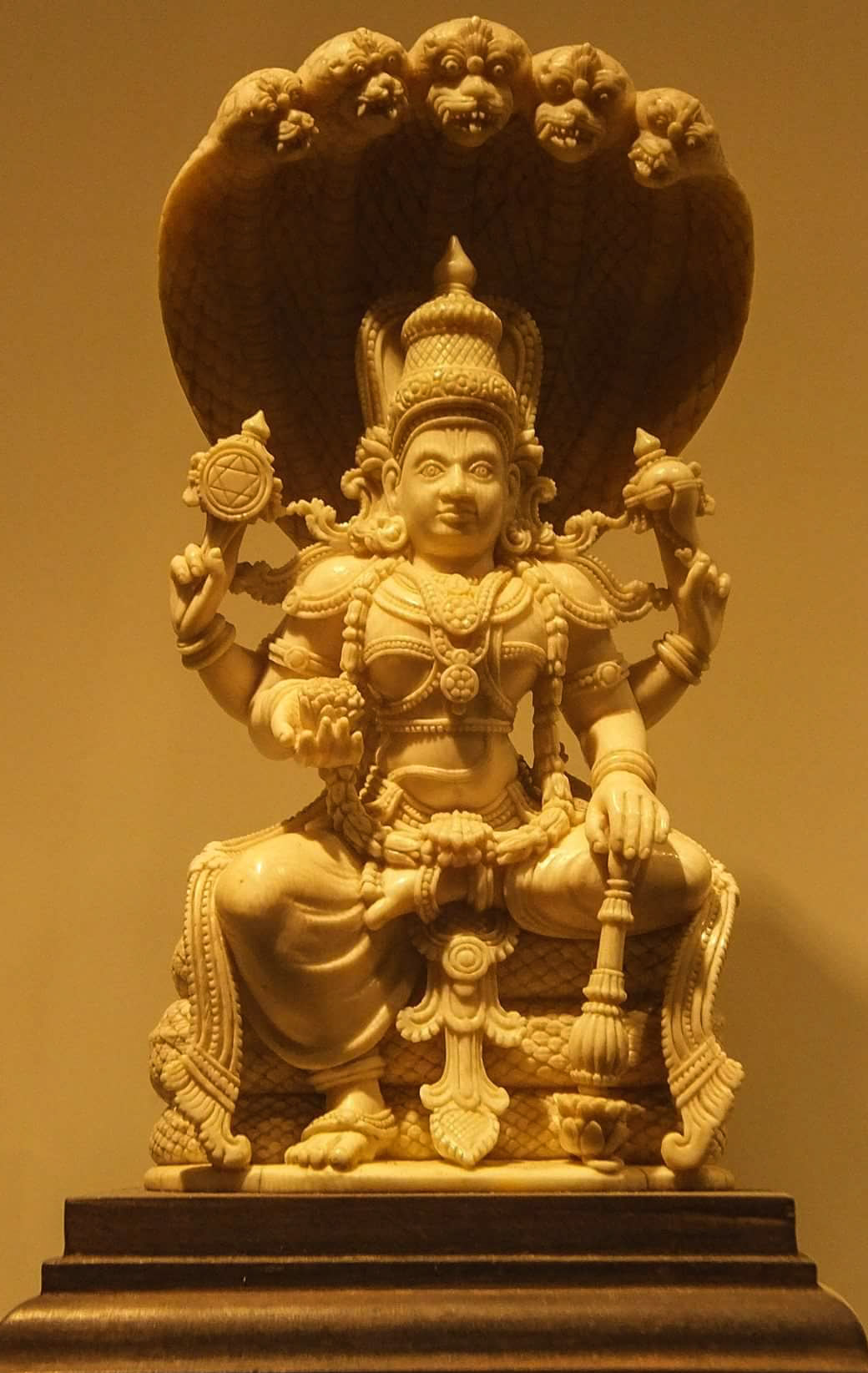
Ivory depiction of Vishnu as Adimurti

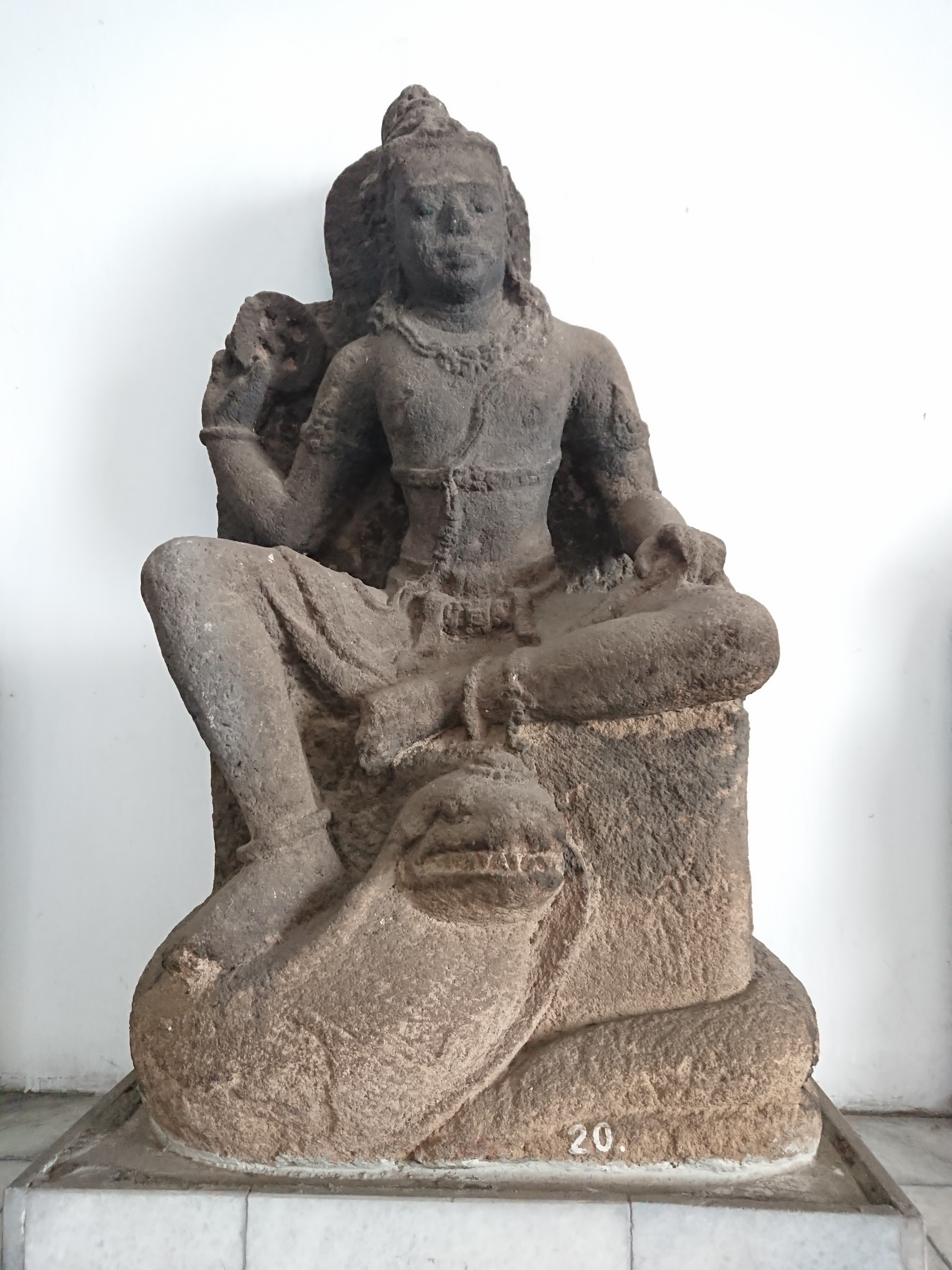
Statue of Adimurti at the National Museum of Indonesia

Adimurti (Sanskrit: आदिमूर्ति, romanized: Ādimūrti) is a form of the Hindu deity Vishnu. It is regarded to be similar to his form of Narayana. In this form, Vishnu is depicted to be seated upon the coils of his serpent, Shesha.

== Iconography ==
Adimurti is a four-armed representation of Vishnu, portraying his primordial form. He is seated in the sukhasana pose upon the coils of a snake, with his left leg folded over the serpent, and the right leg hanging sideways. Five or seven heads of Shesha form a canopy over his head, and hold the symbols of the deity. He is accompanied by his two consorts.
