= Ananthazhwar =

Indian Vaishnavite

Ananthalwar (அனந்தாழ்வார்)
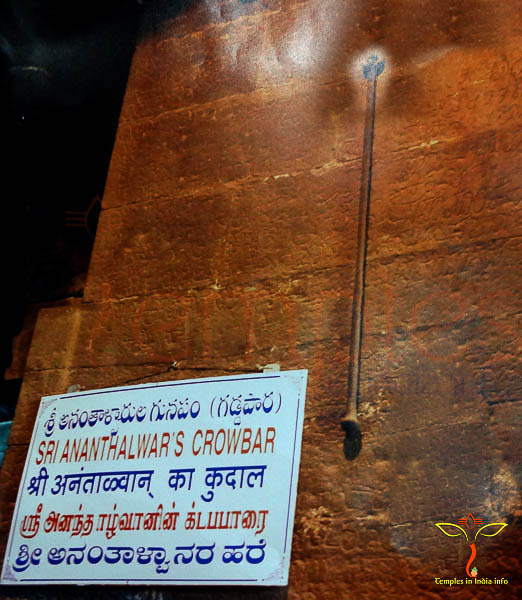
- Ananthalwar's Crowbar, hanging on the walls of the Venkateswara Temple in Tirumala.
- Born: Ananthalwar; Unknown (11th century); Kirangoor, Karnataka, India
- Died: Unknown (Late 11th century); Tirumala, Andhra Pradesh, India
- Resting place: Unmarked samadhi in Tirumala, Andhra Pradesh, India
- Known for: Being a devotee of Venkateswara
- Spouse: Unknown

Ananthalwar was a disciple of Saint Ramanuja and an 11th-century Vaishnava figure of India. His birthplace is recorded to be a place called Kirangoor, Ananthalwar kovil located in small village close to Srirangapatna of Karnataka.

== Legend of Venkateswara ==
The story goes that the famous Vaishnava saint Ramanuja once asked Ananthalwar to raise a flower garden for Lord Venkateswara in Tirumala, the abode of Venkateswara. Ananthalwar abided by the request and went upon raising a garden. He took the help of his pregnant wife who found it difficult to do the manual labor from time to time. Lord Venkateswara, having seen the trouble of Ananthalwar assumed the form of a young boy and helped her out. On one occasion when this came to the notice of Ananthalwar, the latter was furious and he hit the boy with a crowbar on the chin. The boy then disappeared but when Ananthalwar visited the Venkateswara Temple in Tirumala, he found that the Lord was bleeding from the chin. He at once realised that it was the Lord who had helped his wife in the form of the boy and regretted his act. He applied camphor (karpuram) for the wound. Lord Venkateswara was impressed with Ananthalwar's devotion and not only forgave him but also told him that he would display the camphor applied to his chin forever as a mark of Ananthalwar's devotion. Thus, camphor is applied to the main idol's chin to this day during the rituals. Even today you can see Ananthalwar's Crowbar (with which he hit the Lord in the form of the boy) when you enter the temple, hanging on the temple's right wall.
