= Buddhapad Hoard =

Collection of Buddhist and Jain sculptures

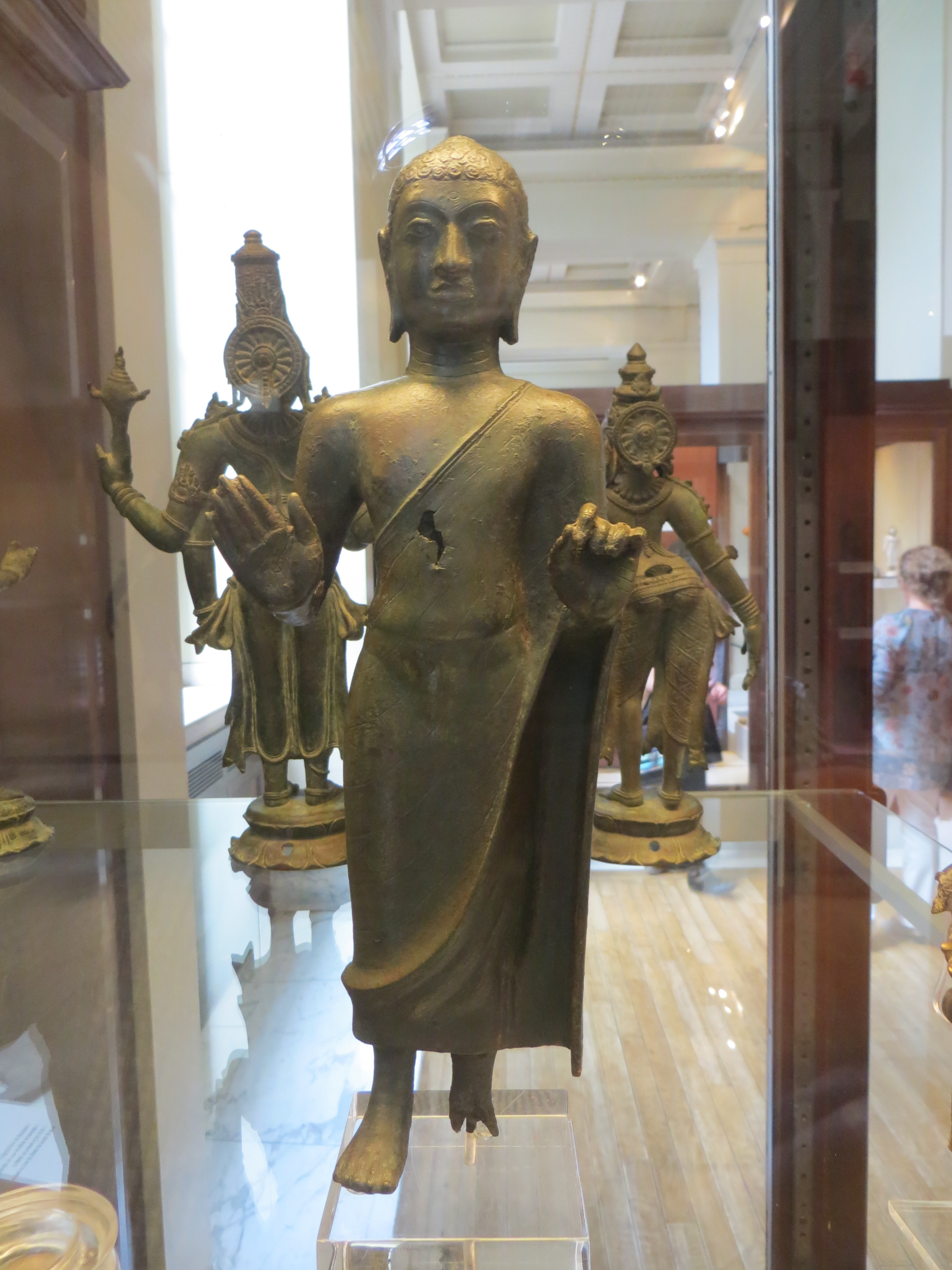
- Sculpture of the Buddha from the Buddhapad Hoard in the British Museum
- Material: Bronze
- Created: 6th-8th Centuries AD
- Present location: British Museum, London
- Registration: 1905,1218.1-15

The Buddhapad Hoard or Buddam Hoard is a large cache of Buddhist and Jain sculptures found near the town of Buddam in Andhra Pradesh, southern India. Since 1905, it has formed an important part of the British Museum's South Asian collection. Dating from 6th-8th centuries AD, the style of craftsmanship fuses the northern influences of the Gupta period with the southern traditions of the Deccan, which in turn greatly influenced Buddhist art in South East Asia in subsequent centuries.

== Discovery and original ownership ==
The hoard was discovered in about 1870 by workers digging a canal, and was described by the colonial historian Robert Sewell in 1895. The artefacts was subsequently donated by the Secretary of State for India to the British Museum in 1905. Given the religious nature of the sculptures, the cache may have originally formed part of a ritual deposit from a Buddhist temple or monastery.

== Description ==
The 6th-8th century hoard is composed of fifteen bronze Buddhist and Jain images, the vast majority of which are either statuettes or parts of small figures. There are three relatively intact standing statuettes of the Buddha (the largest of which is 38 cm high), 4 bronze arms, two bases for standing figures (one of which has a Brahmi inscription), two small Buddha heads, and a bronze model of a stupa. Jain figures are a shrine with a tirthankara, and two fragmentary figures of Parsvanatha. The Buddhist context of some of the smaller body fragments is probable rather than certain.

== Gallery ==
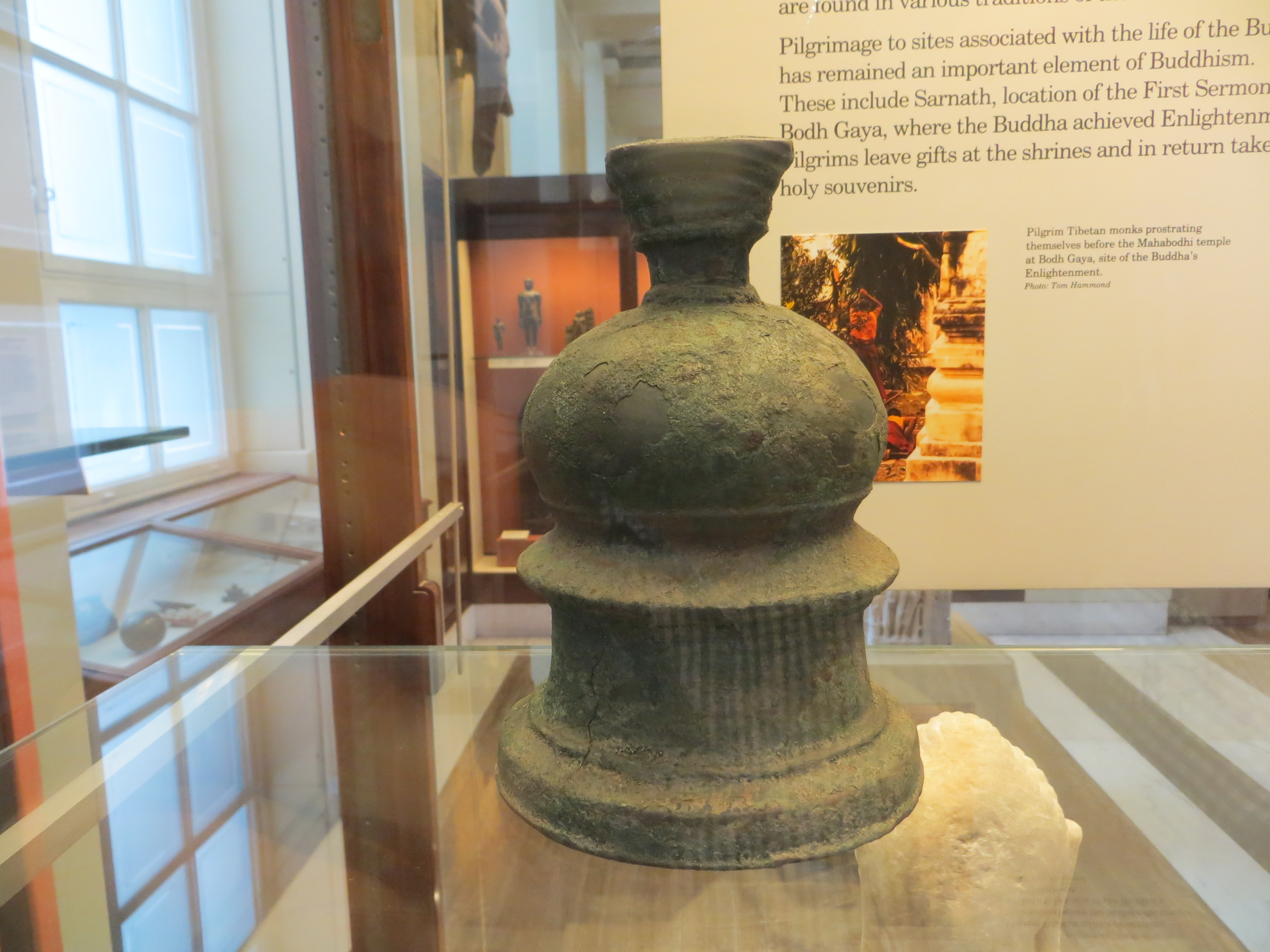
Model of a stupa from the hoard

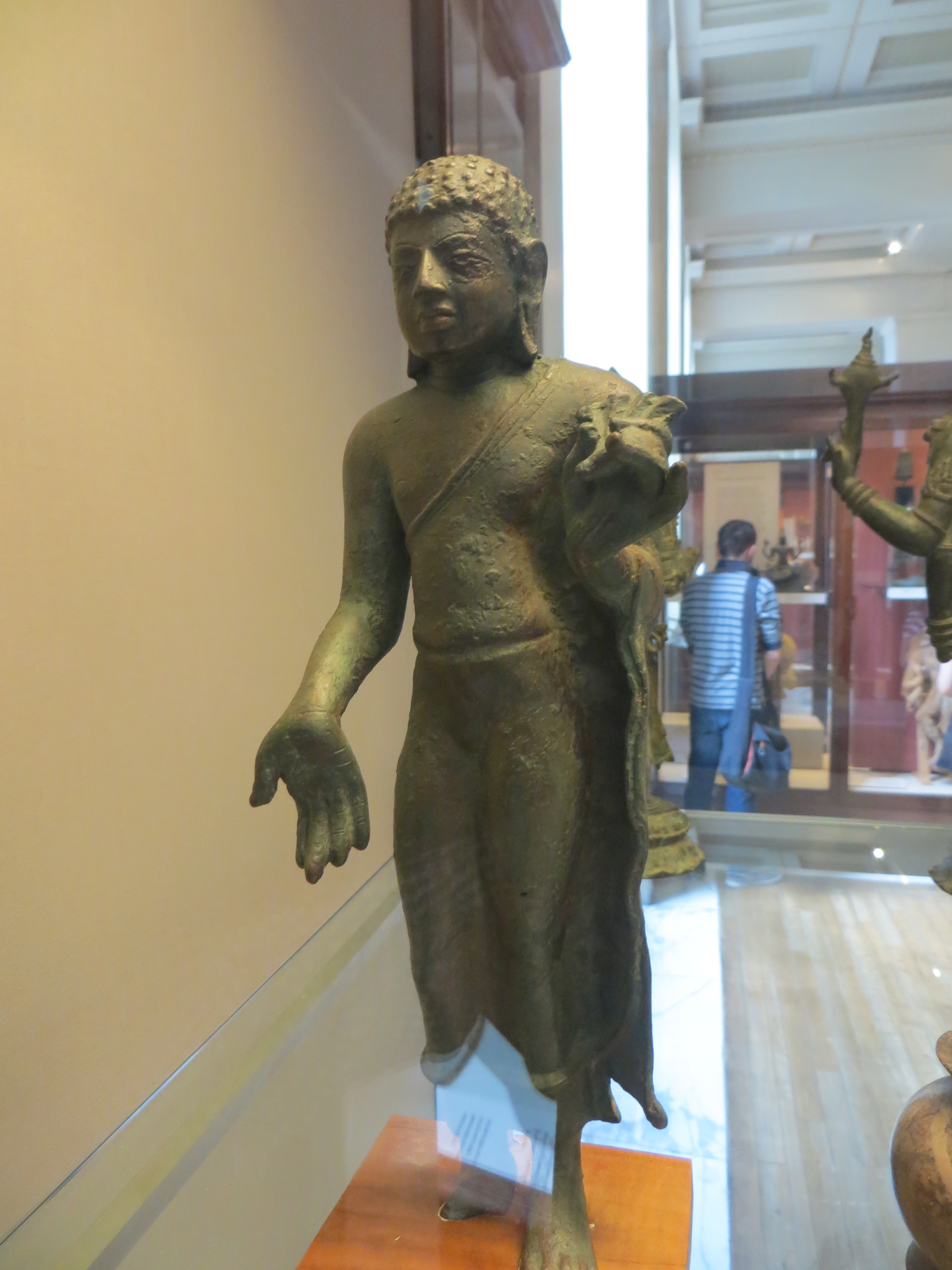
Bronze statuette of the Buddha with varadamudra gesture

== Bibliography ==
- Zwalf W, Buddhism: Art and Faith, London, British Museum
- Barrett D, Studies in Indian Sculpture and Painting, London
- R. Fisher, Buddhist art and architecture (London, Thames & Hudson, 1993)
