= Tirumala ghat roads =

Mountain roads in India

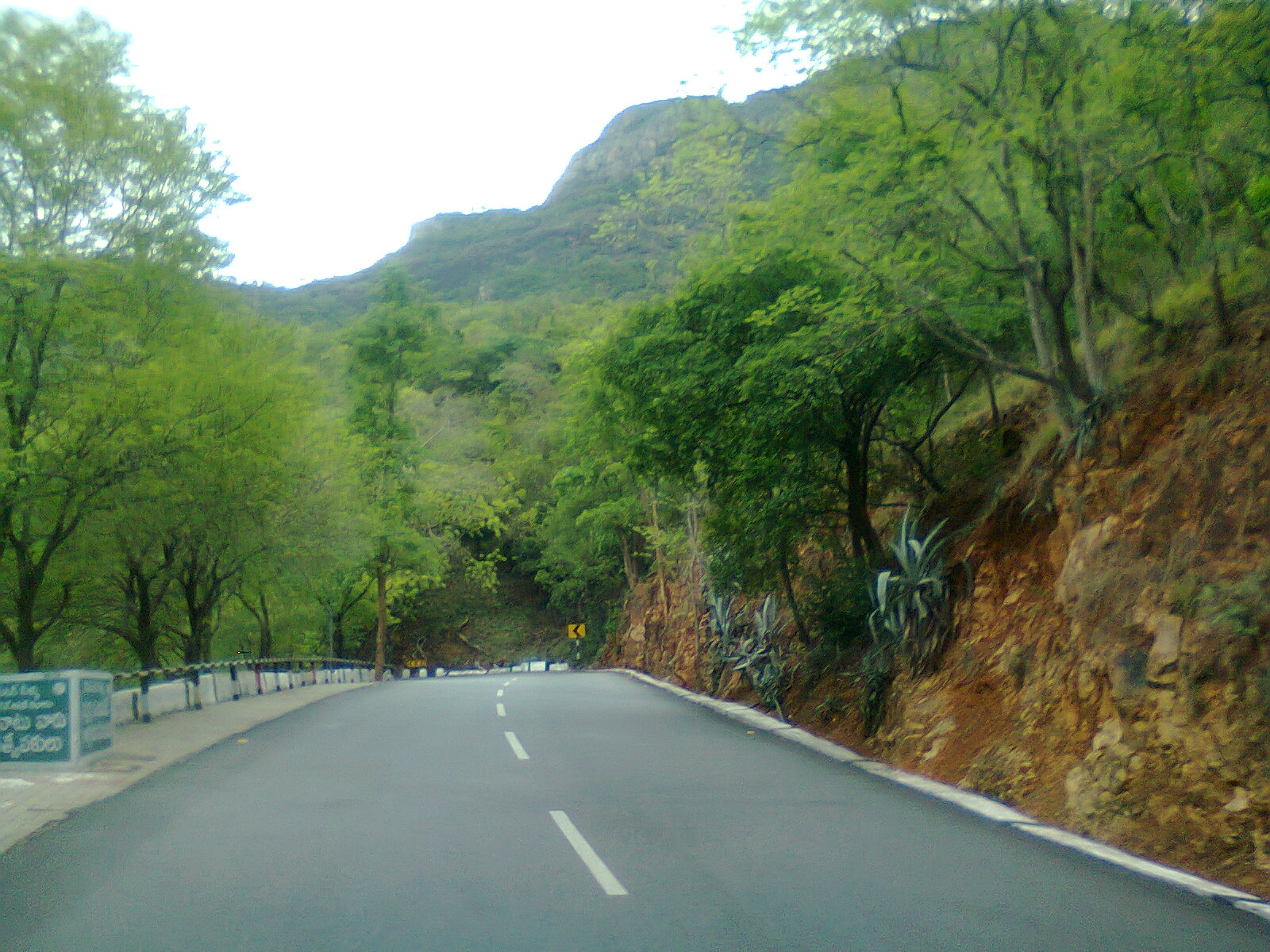

Route information
- Maintained by Tirumala Tirupati Devasthanams
- Length: 18 km (11 mi)
- History: First road opened in 1944 and the second in 1974

Major junctions
- From: Alipiri, Tirupati
- To: Tirumala

Location
- Country: India
- States: Andhra Pradesh

Highway system
- Roads in India; Expressways; National; State; Asian

Tirumala ghat roads are a pair of ghat roads that connect Tirupati and Tirumala in the Indian state of Andhra Pradesh.

== Description ==
The Tirumala ghat roads connect Alipiri, a neighbourhood of Tirupati with Tirumala located atop the Venkatadri hill in the Seshachalam Hills of the Eastern Ghats. The two-lane roads stretch 18 km (11 mi) and 17.8 km (11.1 mi), and are used for downward and upward traffic respectively. It is maintained by the Tirumala Tirupati Devasthanams.

It takes about 40 minutes to reach the Tirumala Venkateswara Temple in Tirumala from the foothills. There is a tollgate and security zone at Alipiri. The roads are open for 21 hours a day and closed from 12 am to 3 am. Approximately 10,000 vehicles use the roads everyday, with the count higher on special and festival days.

== History ==
The first road was constructed in the late 1930s, and the first trial runs were conducted in 1939. It was designed by Nageswara Iyer, then chief engineer for the government. It was opened for public use in 1944. The second road was constructed in the early 1970s, and opened in 1974.

== See also ==
- Nilgiri Ghat Roads
