= Agham =

Agham may refer to:

- Advocates of Science and Technology for the People, a Philippine-based non-governmental science advocacy organization
- AGHAM Partylist, or Alyansa ng mga Grupong Haligi ng Agham at Teknolohiya para sa Mamamayan, a political party in the Philippines
- Agham Kot, a ruined town in Sindh, Pakistan
- Agham Lohana, king of Brahmanabad, in modern Pakistan

== See also ==
- Agam (disambiguation)
