= Chaturbhuja =

Hindu iconography of four-armed deities

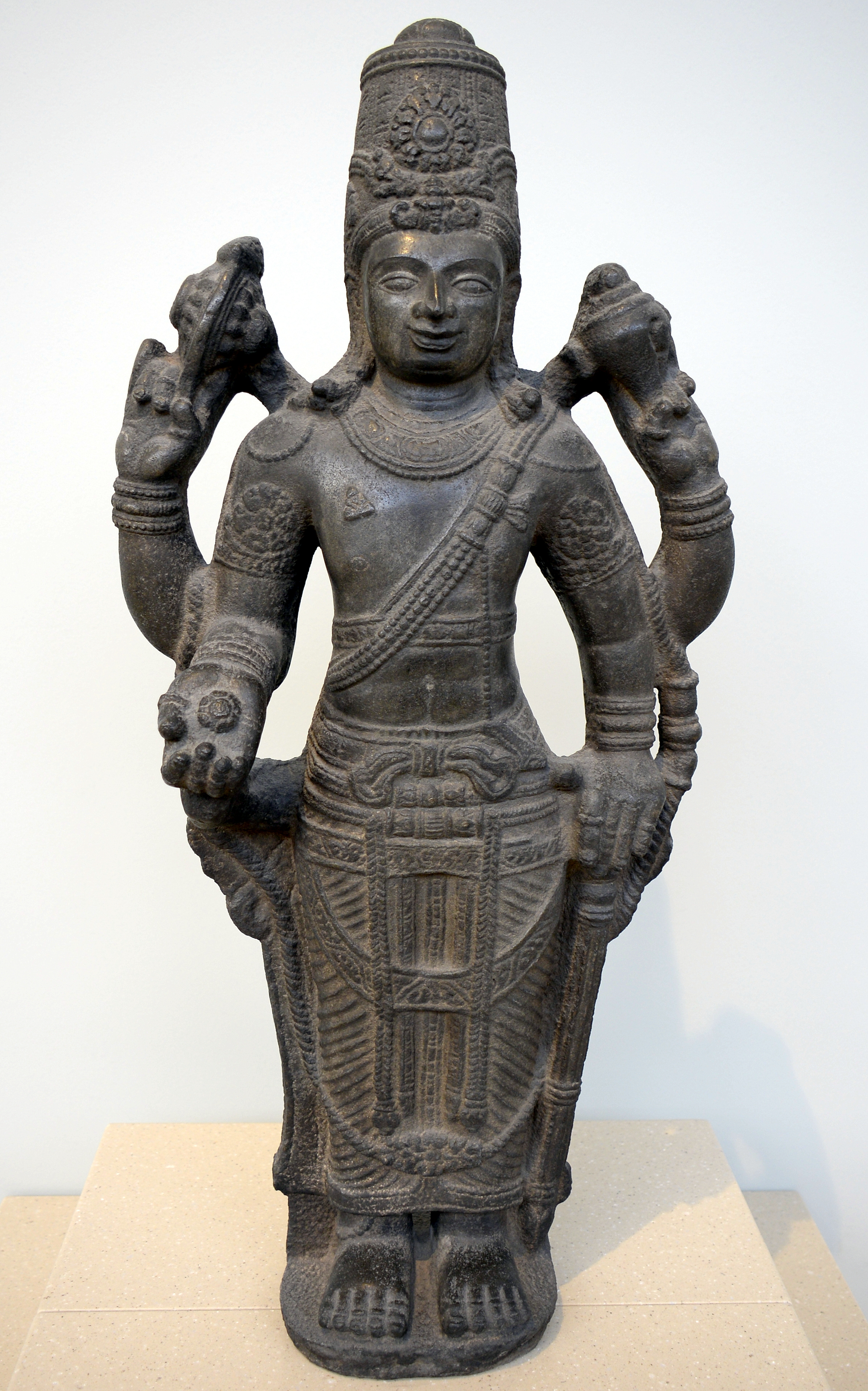
Granite figure of Vishnu, India, 16th century CE. National Museum of Scotland, Edinburgh.

Chaturbhuja (Sanskrit: चतुर्भुज, romanized: Caturbhuja, lit. 'four-armed') is a concept in Hindu iconography in which a deity is depicted with four arms. Several Hindu deities are often portrayed with four arms in their iconography, featured in Hindu literature. The iconography of four arms is regarded to symbolise divinity and power, as well as dominion over the four quarters of the universe.

Chaturbhuja is also primarily employed as an epithet for the preserver deity, Vishnu.

== Description ==
The earliest Vaishnava images, according to scholar Gavin Flood, are of a standing two or four-armed figure bearing a combination of the attributes of a conch, a wheel, and a mace in their iconography. This multiplicity convention, in which deities bore numerous limbs and heads in their imagery, was established in the Mathura region, before becoming a custom in later Hindu iconography.

According to author Nanditha Krishna, the chaturbhuja representation of Hindu deities in their icons is regarded to depict their unlimited potential. It exhibits their divine ability to wield multiple articles, such as weapons, and perform numerous activities simultaneously.

Indologist Doris Srinivasan states that in both Vaishnava and Shaiva imagery, the Chaturbhuja form is regarded to be the manifestation of a deity who descends upon the earth and performs auspicious acts for the well-being of mankind, typically receiving the veneration of human beings.

== Examples ==
Vishnu is generally depicted with four arms, carrying his four attributes of the Panchajanya (conch), Sudarshana Chakra (discus), Kaumodaki (mace), and Padma (lotus). His ten incarnations are also often depicted in their icons with these four attributes, most prominently in his avatar of Krishna.

Lakshmi carries lotuses in two of her hands, the other two expressing the gestures of the abhaya mudra and the varada mudra, sometimes replaced by a kalasha and a mirror.

Shiva is depicted with four hands in his form of Nataraja. His back right hand holds a damaru (drum), his front right hand expresses the abhaya mudra, the back left hand carries fire upon a vessel or the palm of his hand, and his front left hand expresses the gajahasta mudra. This allegorical depiction of his multiple arms is regarded to indicate his functions of creation and destruction.

Parvati is described as four-handed, holding a noose and a goad, and the other two hands portraying the abhaya mudra and the varada mudra in the Shiva Purana.

Ardhanarishvara, a composite form, holds a trishula (trident) and expresses the varada mudra on the right half, representing Shiva, while the left half holds a lotus, representing Parvati.

Harihara, a composite form, holds a trishula and skull-cap in his two right hands, representing Shiva, and a conch and a discus in his two left hands, representing Vishnu.

Brahma is depicted to be holding the Vedas and a rosary in his four hands.

Saraswati is portrayed as holding the instrument known as the veena with two of her hands, and an assortment of a book, a noose, a rosary, an elephant goad, and a lotus in her other two hands.

Ganesha bears a noose, an elephant goad, a sweet dumpling called the modaka, and his other hand portrays the abhaya mudra.

Indra is portrayed with a spear, a goad, the Vajra, and a blue lotus.

Agni is featured with four hands in the Harivamsha.

Tripura Sundari is described with four hands in the Kalika Purana.

== Gallery ==
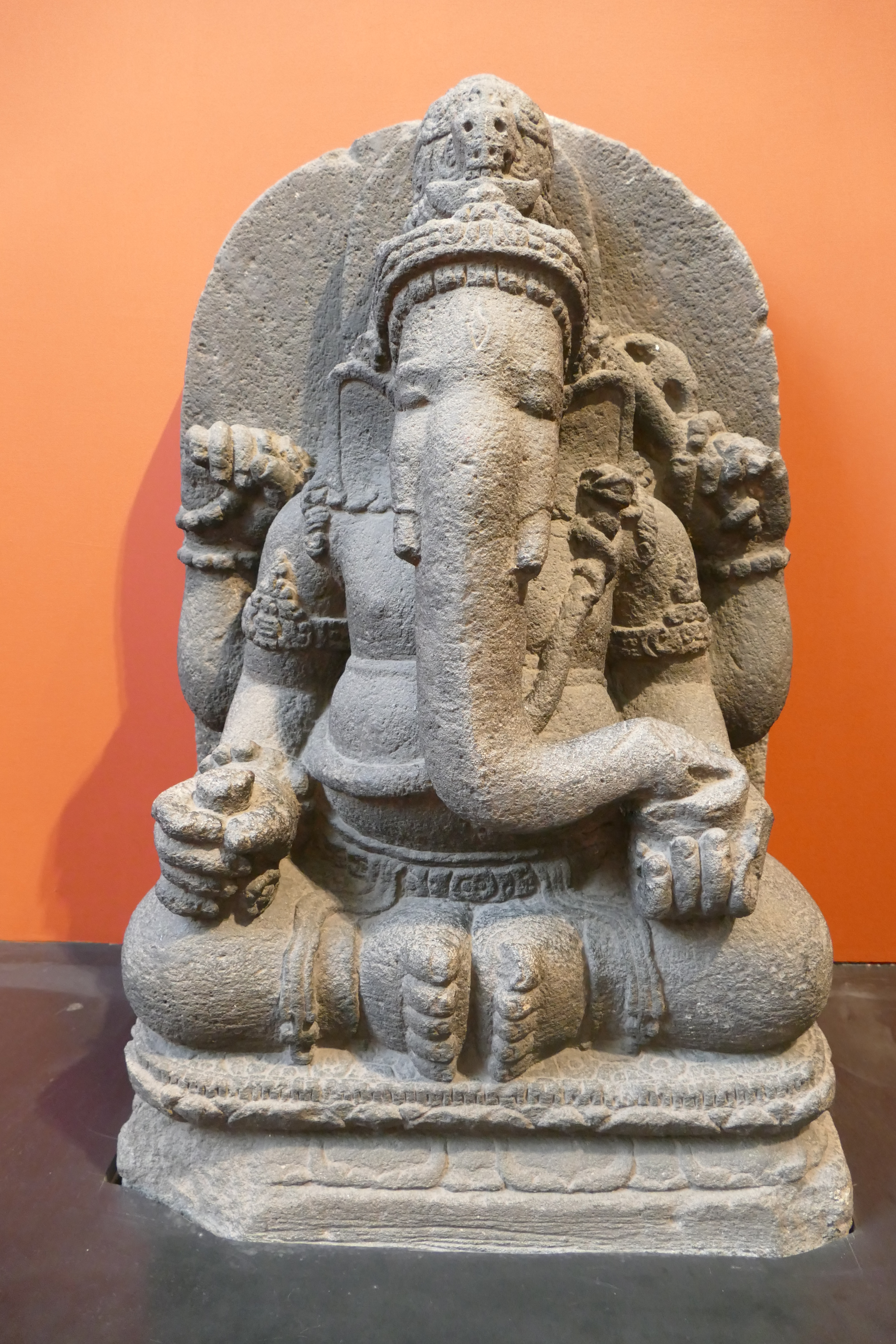
Ganesha in the Indian Museum, Kolkata

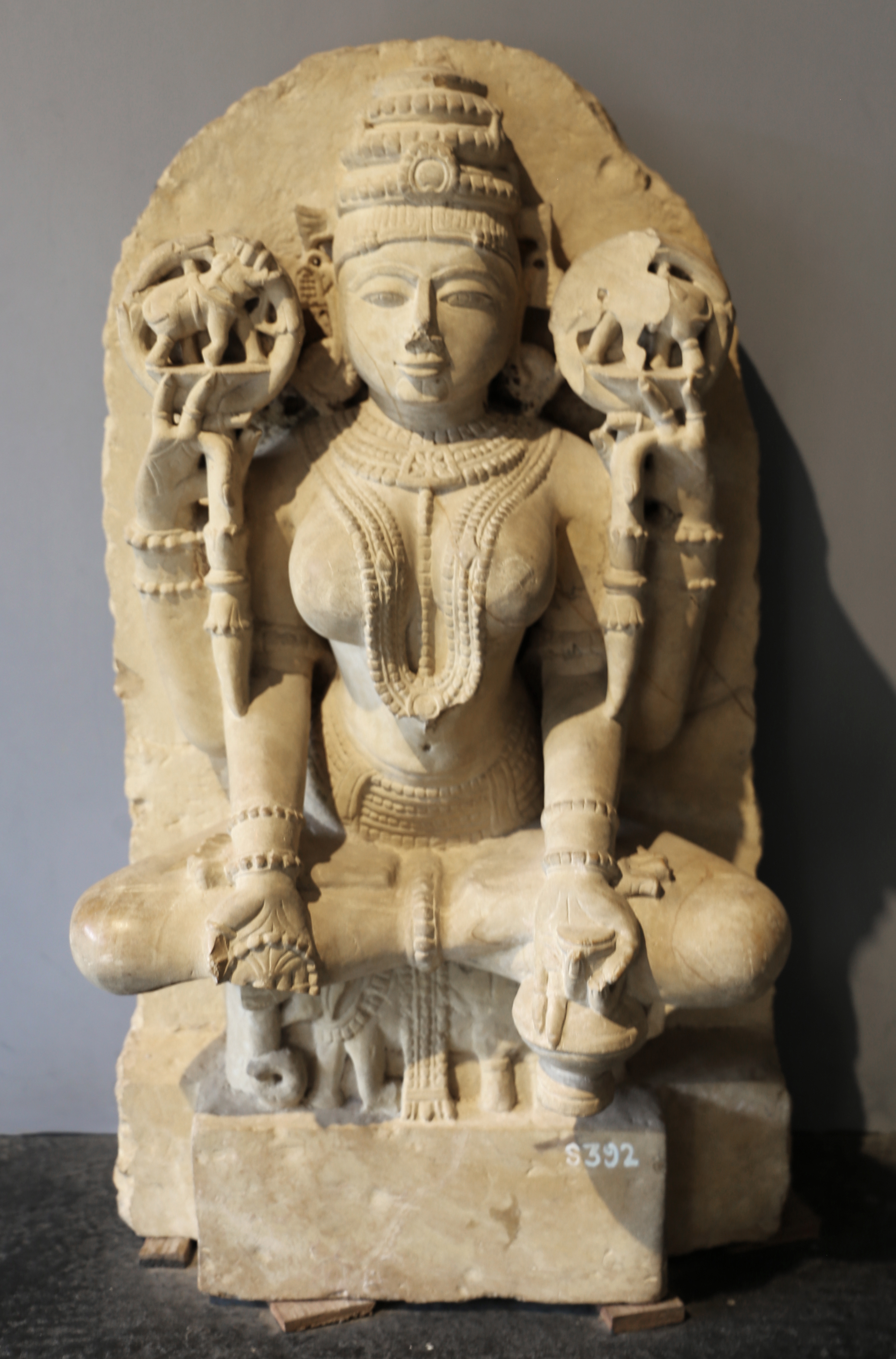
Lakshmi, Gujarat

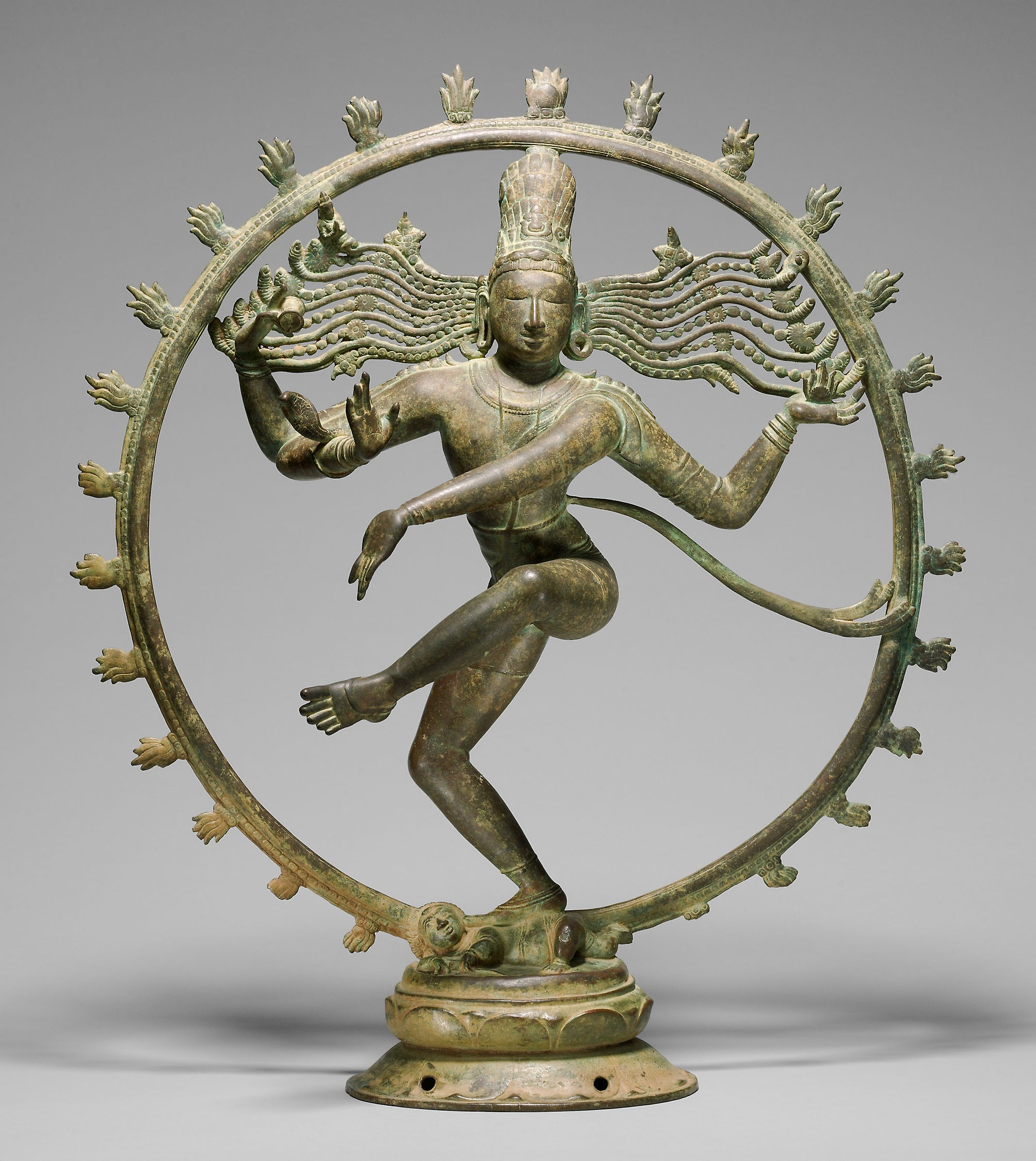
Shiva as Nataraja, Tamil Nadu

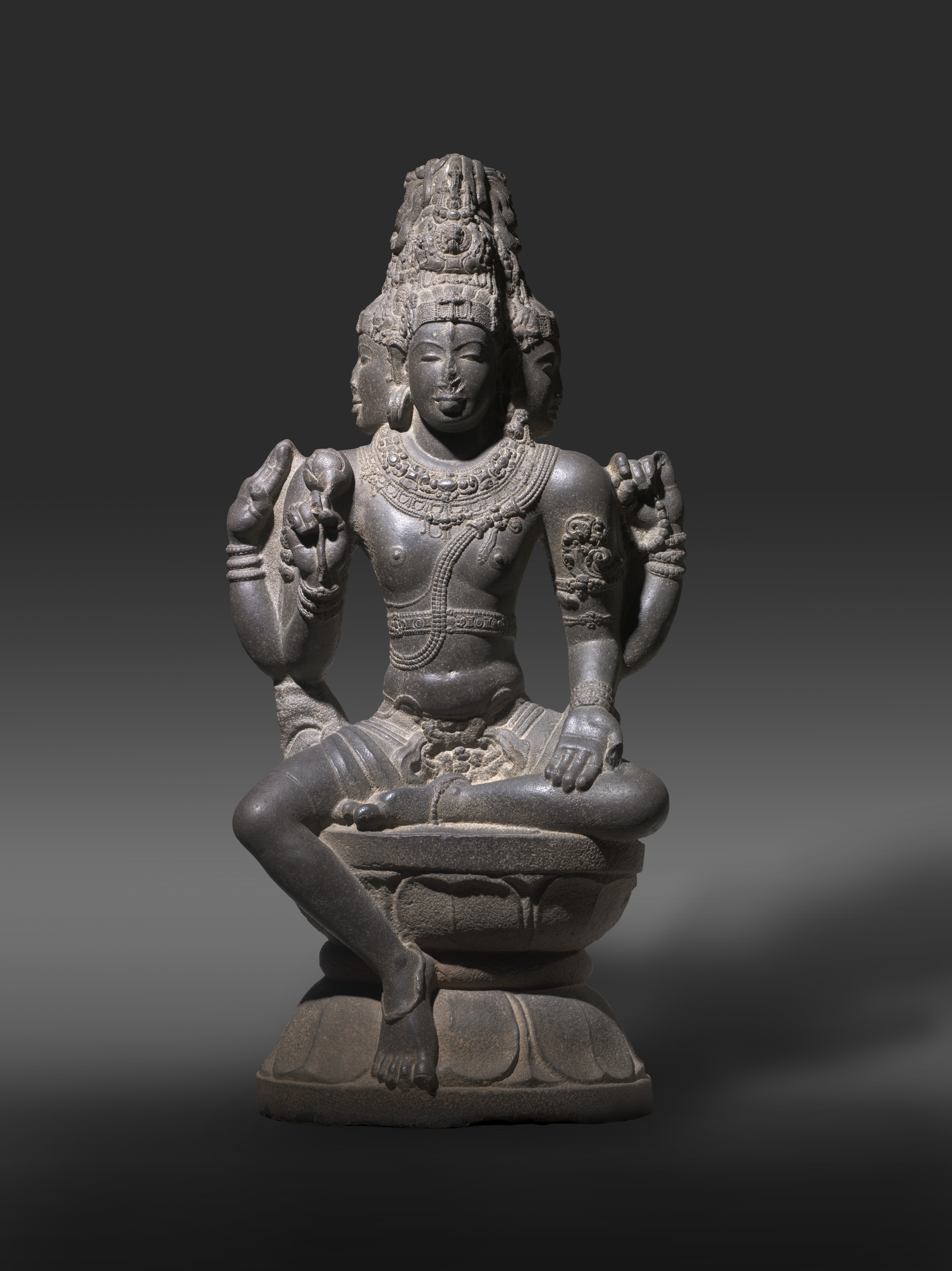
Brahma, Tamil Nadu

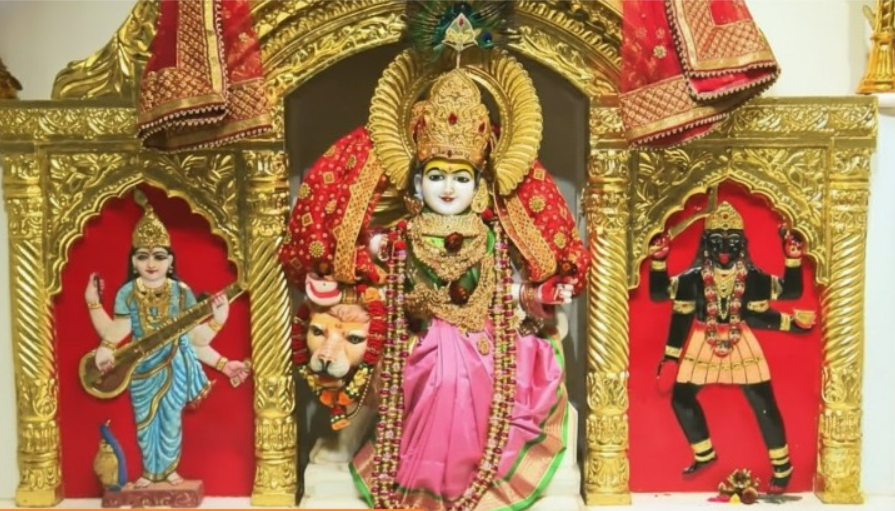
Saraswati (left), Jhandewali Devi (centre), and Kali (right), Delhi

== See Also ==
- Ashtabhuja – Iconographic form of eight-armed deities in Hinduism
- Hecatoncheires – Greek mythological giants with 50 heads and 100 arms
