= Alipiri =

- Neighborhood
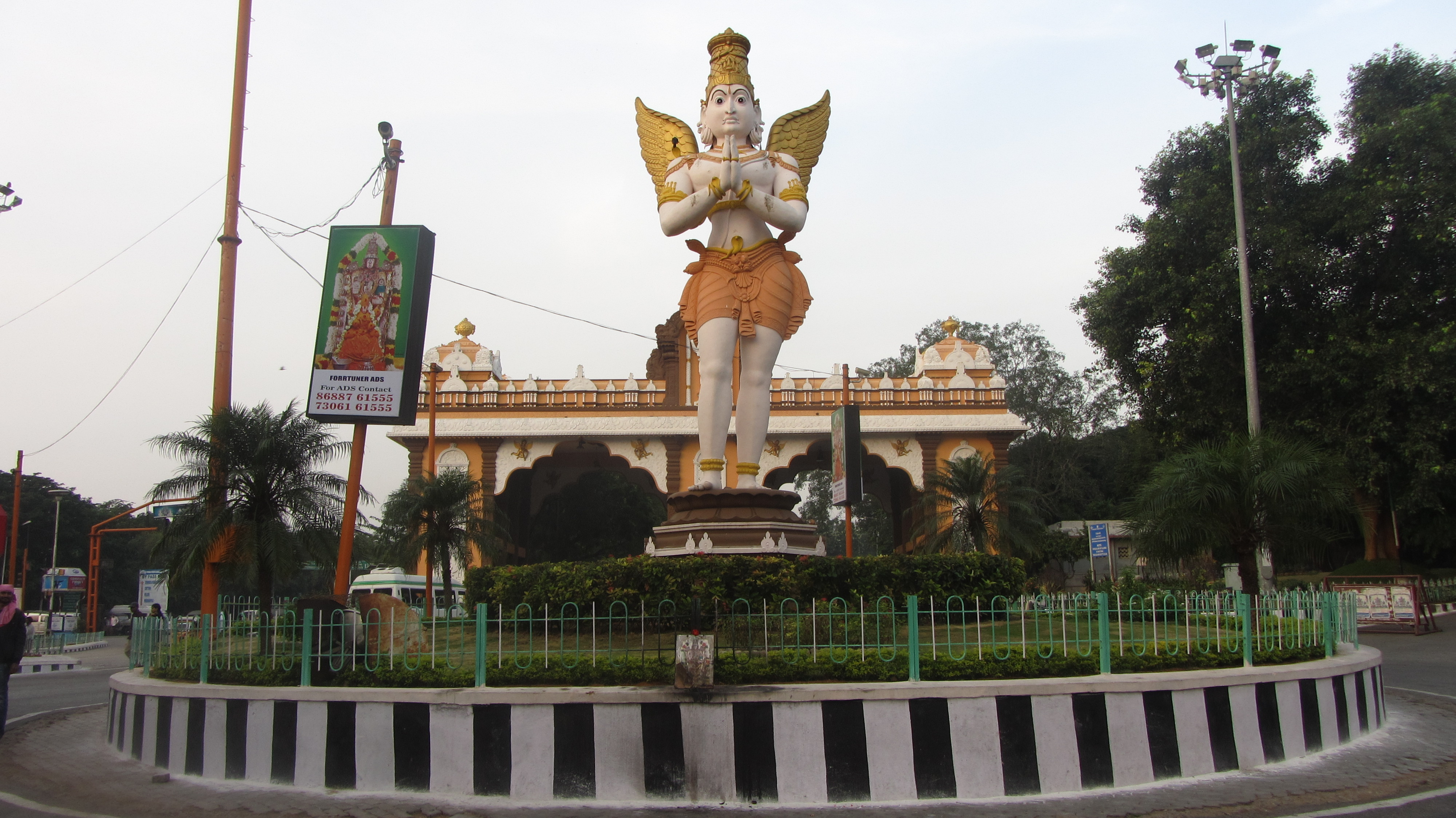
- Garuda statue at Alipiri in Añjali Mudrā

- Location in Andhra Pradesh, India
- Country: India
- State: Andhra Pradesh
- City: Tirupati

Languages
  - Official: Telugu
- Time zone: UTC+5:30 (IST)
- PIN: 517501
- Vehicle registration: AP 03
- Lok Sabha constituency: Tirupati
- Vidhan Sabha constituency: Tirupati

Alipiri Padala Mandapam or Alipiri is the place at the foot of seven hills in Tirupati, near the Tirumala Venkateswara Temple, in the state of Andhra Pradesh, India. It is a neighbourhood of Tirupati city.

Alipiri is one of two pathways to reach Tirumala on foot, and it was, until recently, the only one being used in modern times. Srivari Mettu, about 2 km away, is the original one that was renovated and brought back in to use in 2008. Alipiri is the longer route with 3550 steps (over 9 km), whereas Srivari Mettu is shorter with 2388 steps (spanning about 2 km).

Alipiri is also the foot of two road ways, one up and one down leading to Tirumala through the Seven Hills. It is therefore called "The Gateway to Tirumala Venkateswara Temple".

A long time ago, pilgrims used to climb all Seven Hills through the stepped way on foot because there were no other options. Pilgrims would visit from far away, cook and eat there and rest for some time. After resting, they would start to climb the steps.

Now the entire stepped way is covered with a roof to protect pilgrims from sunlight and rain. Lights are also provided. Special privilege is provided to the pilgrims who came on foot to visit the Lord.

== Etymology ==
Alipiri literally means "resting place".

== Temples ==
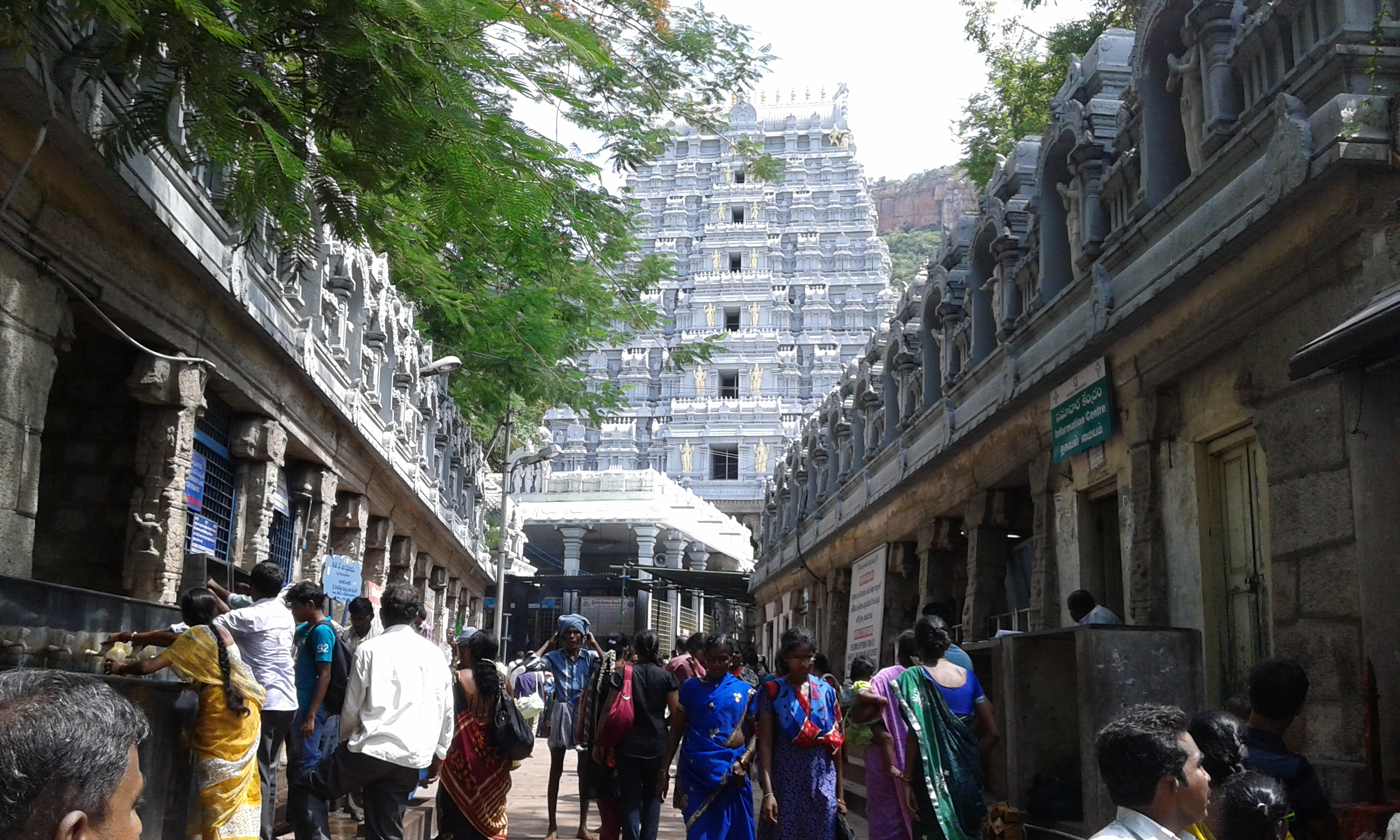
Alipiri Padala mandapam Gopuram, Tirupati

=== Srivari Padala Mandapam ===
Srivari Padala Mandapam is a temple dedicated to Lord Venkateswara at Alipiri. The presiding deity is referred to Padala Venkateswara Swamy. As per legend, Lord Venkateswara, after Ekantha Seva at Tirumala, would come visit his consort Padamavati at Tiruchanur, down the hill through Alipiri Steps and would leave his footwear at this place and hence the name "Padala Mandapam" (Telugu : Padalu refers to Foot). Devotees on Tirumala Yatra from Tirupati offer prayers here first by carrying "Srivari Padukalu" (believed to be a representation of the footwear worn by Lord Venkateswara himself) on their heads. The temple comes under Sri Govindaraja Swamy Temple circle and is being administered by Tirumala Tirupati Devasthanams (TTD).

=== Sri Lakshmi Narayana Swamy Temple ===
There is a temple dedicated to Lord Lakshmi Narayana in the Alipiri Padala Mandapam Temple complex which lies east of Padala Mandapam. The temple entrance and the deity face towards the west. It has a shrine dedicated to Andal.

=== Sri Vinayaka Swamy Temple ===
There is also a temple dedicated to Lord Ganesha in the Alipiri Padala Mandapam Temple complex which lies on the 2nd Ghat Road leading from Tirupati to Tirumala. Devotees going by Road offer prayers at this temple before starting their Tirumala temple journey.

== Footsteps ==
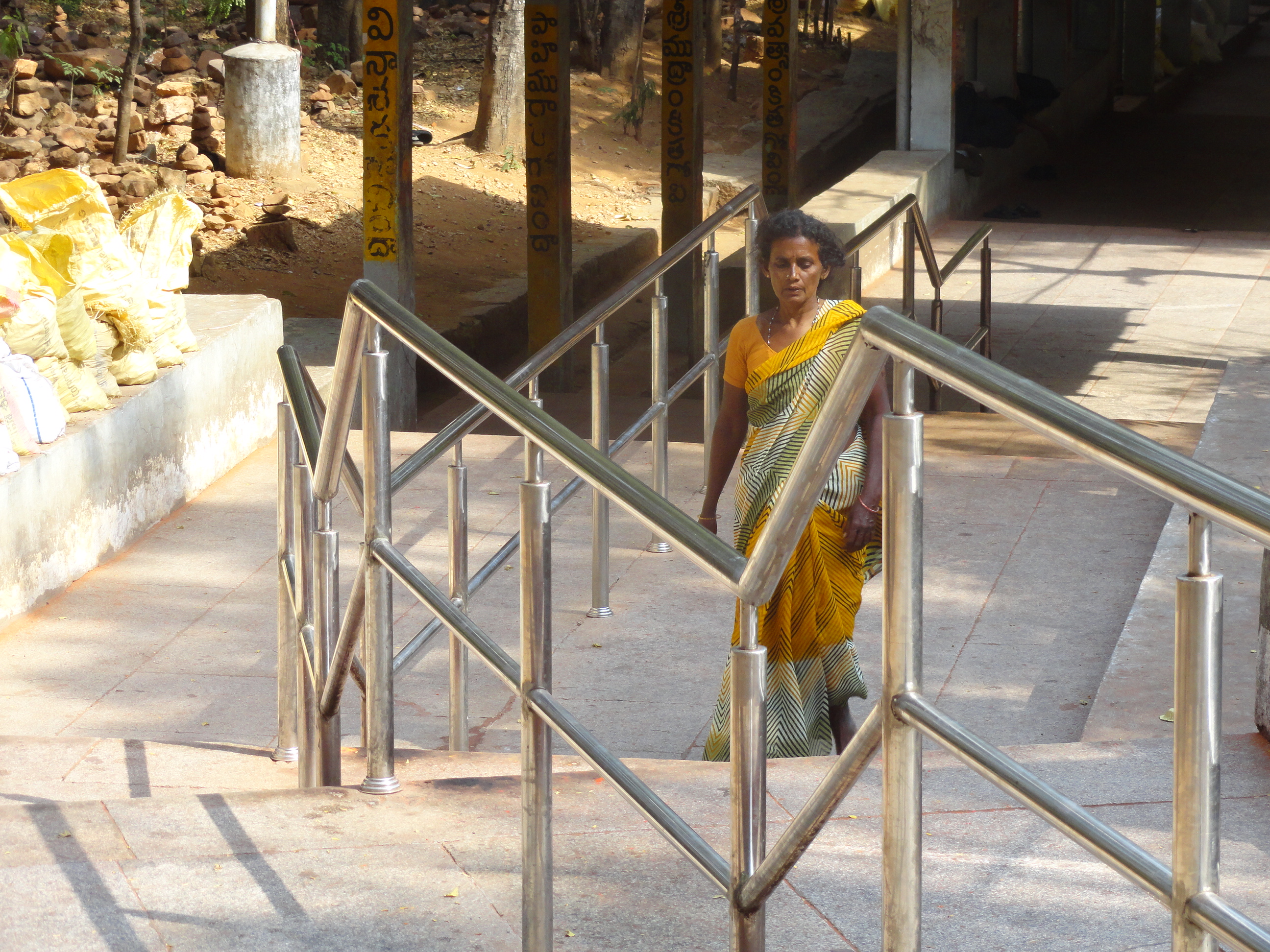
Alipiri Footsteps leading to Tirumala

There is an ancient stairway to Tirumala that starts from Alipiri and is known as Alipiri Metlu. The Devotees, to fulfill their vow to Lord Venkateswara, take this path to reach Tirumala on foot from Tirupati. It consists of a total 3550 steps which makes a distance of 12 km. A free of cost public service allows devotees to drop their luggage and footwear at the beginning of the stairway to be collected once they reach the end of the steps. There are four Gopuram (Temple Towers) on the way. It is completely roofed and passes through the seven hills which are part of Seshachalam Hills.

== Festivals ==
All Vaishnavite festivals are celebrated at Padala Mandapam Temple. These include Vaikuntha Ekadasi, and Rathasapthami.

=== Metlotsavam ===
Metlotsavam is the celebration held once in three months, to the Alipiri stairway leading to Tirumala. It is organised by Dasa sahitya project under Tirumala Tirupati Devasthanams. The festival includes group of devotees trekking to Tirumala singing sacred religious hymns.

== Sapthagiri Security Zone ==
At Alipiri, a security zone was established in 2009 to screen vehicles and pilgrims entering Tirumala, in interest of public safety on the hills.
