= Agam Singh Rai =

Agam Singh Rai (Nepali:अगमसिंह राई चौतारिया) also referred to in some historical sources as Ajit Rai) was a prominent Kirati Rai chief and Chautariya (Chief minister) of the Kingdom of Chaudandi (Majhkirat) during the Gorkhali expansion in the early 1770s. He served under King Karna Sen and played an important political role in the administration of the kingdom. After the Gorkha capture of Hatuwa, Chaudandi in 1773, Agam Singh Rai accompanied King Karna Sen to Bijaypur and later took refuge in Purnea. Early British observer Francis Buchanan-Hamilton later recorded meeting Agam Singh Rai in Purnea, making him an important historical witness to the fall of the Kirati-Sen kingdom. His career illustrates the significant role of Kirati chiefs in the governance and resistance of Chaudandi during Unification of Nepal.
