= Buddam, India =

Buddam
- Village
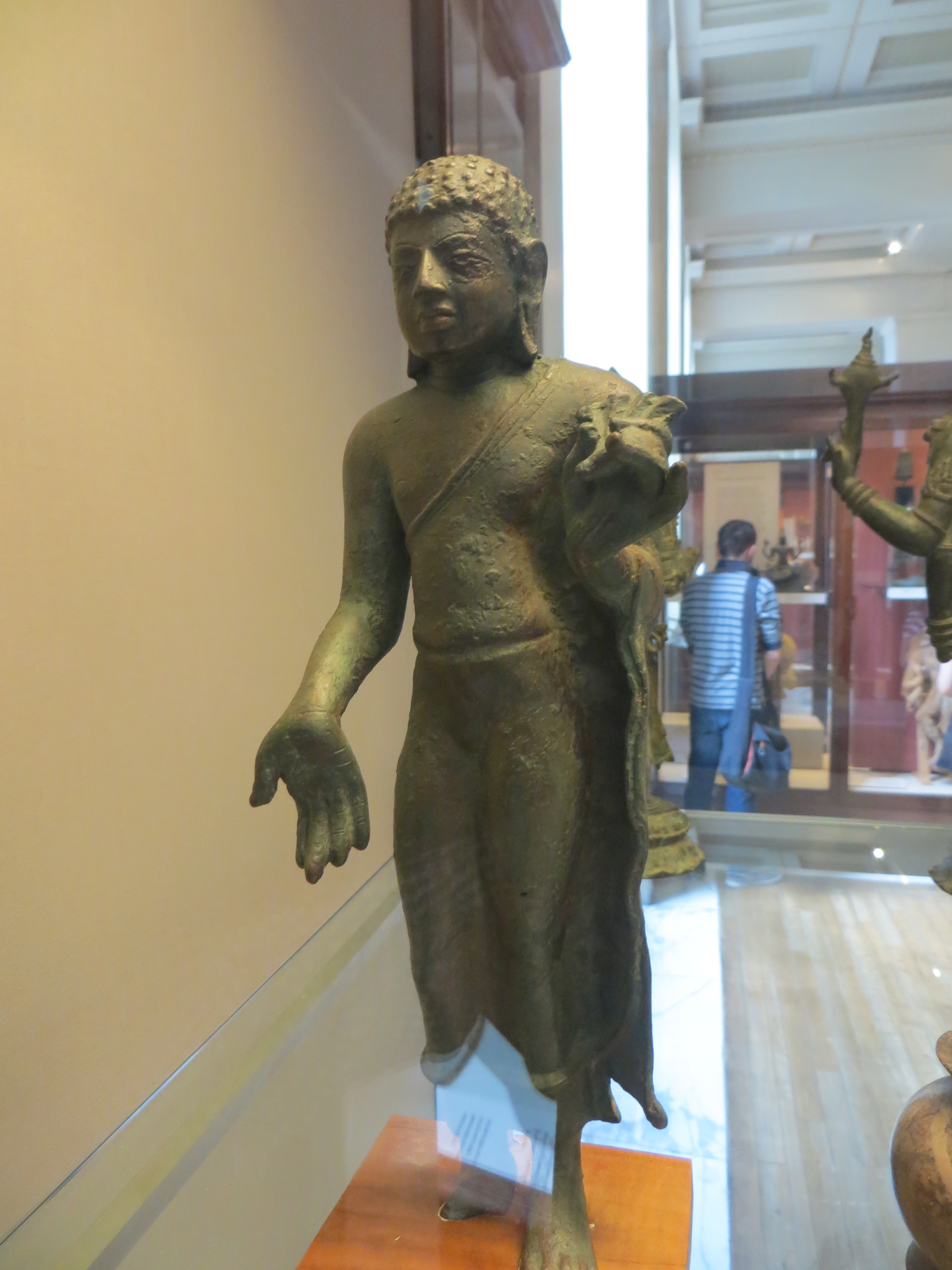
- Bronze statue of Buddha in museum (8th Century AD)
- Interactive map of Buddam
- Location in Andhra Pradesh, India
- Coordinates: 15.9556°N 80.5683°E
- Country: India
- State: Andhra Pradesh
- District: Bapatla
- Mandal: Karlapalem

Government
  - Type: Panchayati raj
  - Body: Buddam gram panchayat

Area
  - Total: 485 ha (1,200 acres)

Population (2011)
  - Total: 1,682
  - Density: 347/km^{2} (898/sq mi)

Languages
  - Official: Telugu
- Time zone: UTC+5:30 (IST)
- PIN: 522614
- Area code: +91–8649
- Vehicle registration: AP

Buddam is a village in Bapatla district of the Indian state of Andhra Pradesh. It is located in Karlapalem mandal of Tenali revenue division.

== History ==
The name Buddam emerged from Bouddha Aramam (Monastery). The archaeological department located many Buddhist relics in and around this village and a few of them are preserved in Amaravati and Hyderabad. A large hoard of bronze Buddhist sculptures dating from the 8th Century AD was found in Buddam in the nineteenth century and is now in the British Museum.

== Geography ==
Buddam is situated to the northeast of the mandal headquarters, Karlapalem, at 15.9556°N 80.5683°E. It is spread over an area of 485 ha (1,200 acres).

== Governance ==
Buddam gram panchayat is the local self-government of the village. It is divided into wards and each ward is represented by a ward member.

== Education ==
As per the school information report for the academic year 2018–19, the village has only one Mandal Parishad schools.

== Visiting place ==
Pavanakumar - Lord Anjaneya temple Established by Late Siddha Purusha "Sri Ramsharan Maharaj", the statue was touched really by Lord Anjaneya before the Idol establishment. In Buddham village, there is a powerful hanuman idol even today, that has many miraculous incidents associated with it. It is called "Pavan Kumar". It was installed by a great mantra Siddha "SriRamSaranMaharaj" alias "Sri Kundurthi Venkata narasaiah paakayaaji". In this video, wonderful incidents from Maharaj's life and the incident behind the installation of Sri. Pavan Kumar is described. Here is the link to their website www.sadgurusriramasaran.com.
