= Tirumala =

Temple town in Andhra Pradesh

- town
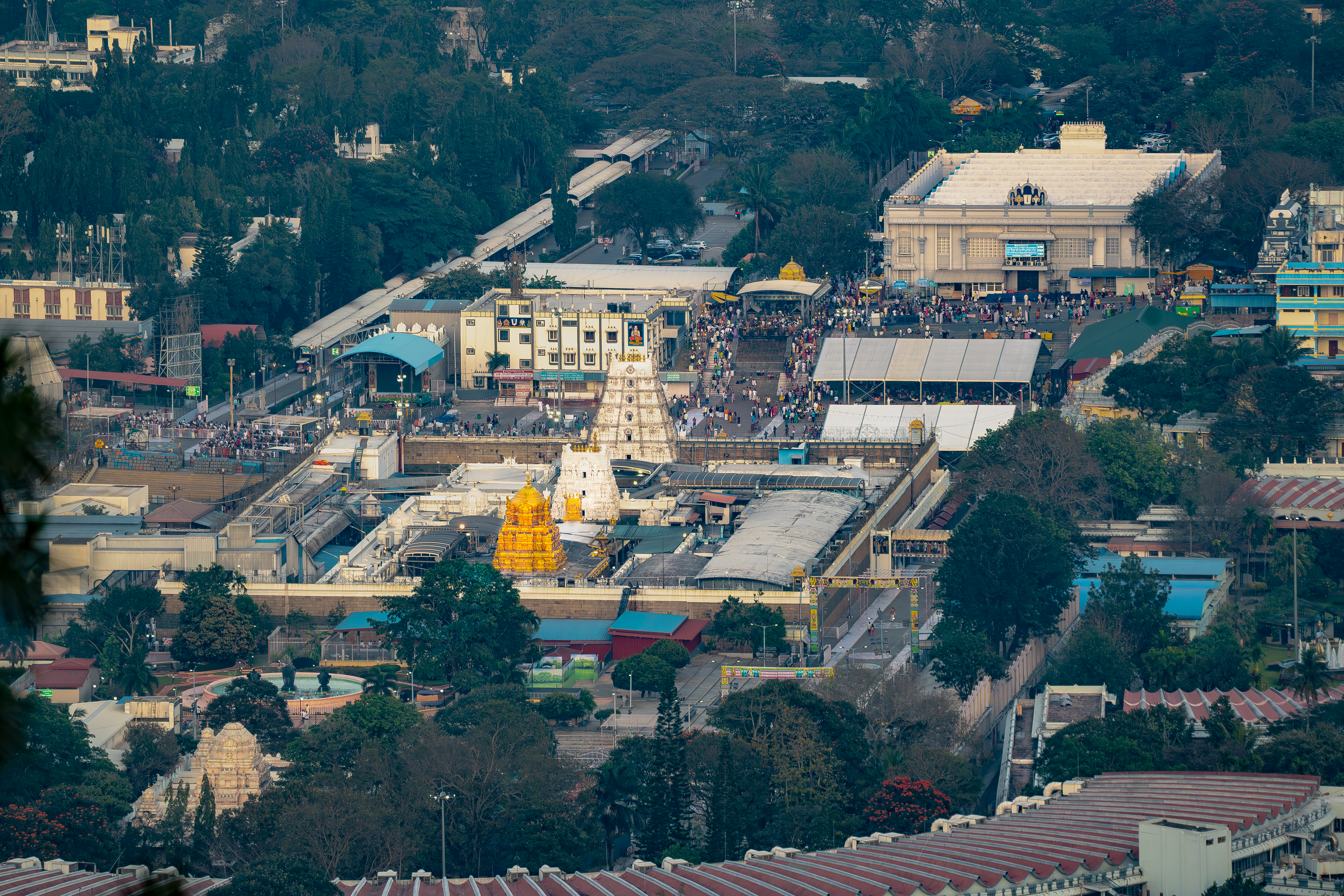
- View of Tirumala with the Venkateswara Temple

- Location in Andhra Pradesh, India
- Coordinates: 13.680916°N 79.350600°E
- Country: India
- State: Andhra Pradesh
- District: Tirupati
- Mandal: Tirupati Urban

Government
  - Type: Special Gram Panchayat
  - Body: Tirumala Tirupati Devasthanam

Area
  - Total: 10.33 km^{2} (3.99 sq mi)
- Elevation: 980 m (3,220 ft)

Population (2011)
  - Total: 7,741
  - Density: 749.4/km^{2} (1,941/sq mi)

Languages
  - Official: Telugu
- Time zone: UTC+5:30 (IST)
- PIN: 517504
- Telephone code: +91–877
- Vehicle registration: AP-03, AP-39

Tirumala is a temple town in Tirupati district of the Indian state of Andhra Pradesh. The town is a part of the Tirupati Urban mandal of the Tirupati revenue division. It is located atop the Venkatadri, one of the seven hills that form the Sapthagiri in the Seshachalam Hills of the Eastern Ghats. It houses the Venkateswara Temple, dedicated to Venkateswara, a form of Vishnu.

== Etymology and names ==
The word Tirumala is of Tamil origin. The prefix "Tiru" is a widely recognised Tamil word and is used in many South Indian place names. It roughly translates to "sacred mountain".

Tirumala is mentioned as Adivarahakshetram in early literature, which is derived from its association with Varaha, the third avatar of Vishnu. It is also sometimes known by the epithet "Bhuloka Vaikuntha" in reference to the abode of Vishnu on the Earth.

== Legend ==
There are several stories from Hindu mythology related to the origin of Tirumala. As per Varaha Purana, at the end of Krita yuga, people prayed to Varaha (Vishnu) to stay back on Earth for their protection. Varaha accepted the request and asked his mount Garuda to bring Kridachala, his divine garden, from Vaikuntha. Garuda placed the garden on the Tirumala hills, and Varaha resided there from then onwards. It further states that Venkateshwara, another form of Vishnu, wished to stay at Tirumala till the end of Kali Yuga, and Varaha agreed to it.

There are several legends associated with Sesha, the king of serpents, and Vayu, the wind god. As per these, both had an argument, which resulted in Vayu blowing away the sacred Mount Meru around which Sesha wound himself tightly. By the time the other gods intervened, a part of the mountain with Sesha was blown to Earth, which became the Venkatadri mountain on which Tirumala resides. The mountain is associated with the head of Sesha, who is said to shelter Vishnu under his hood.

== History ==
While there are references to "Vengadam" in early Tamil literature (1st to 5th century), scholars are divided as to whether it represents Tirumala. The Venkateswara Temple is one of the 101 Divya Desam, sacred sites that are mentioned in the work of Alvars, who are Tamil saint-poets from the early Middle Ages. As per temple tradition and later literature, the temple was constructed by a king named Tondaiman, who discovered the idol of Vishnu while excavating a termite mound. The temple rites were formalised by Ramanuja in the 11th century, and it was expanded by the Cholas, Pandyas, and the Vijayanagara Empire in the later Middle Ages. In 1789, the temple came under the administration of the East India Company, which appointed a group of local Hindu leaders to oversee the administration in 1843. The Tirumala Tirupati Devasthanams was established as a special body in 1932 to administer Tirumala.

== Geography and geology ==
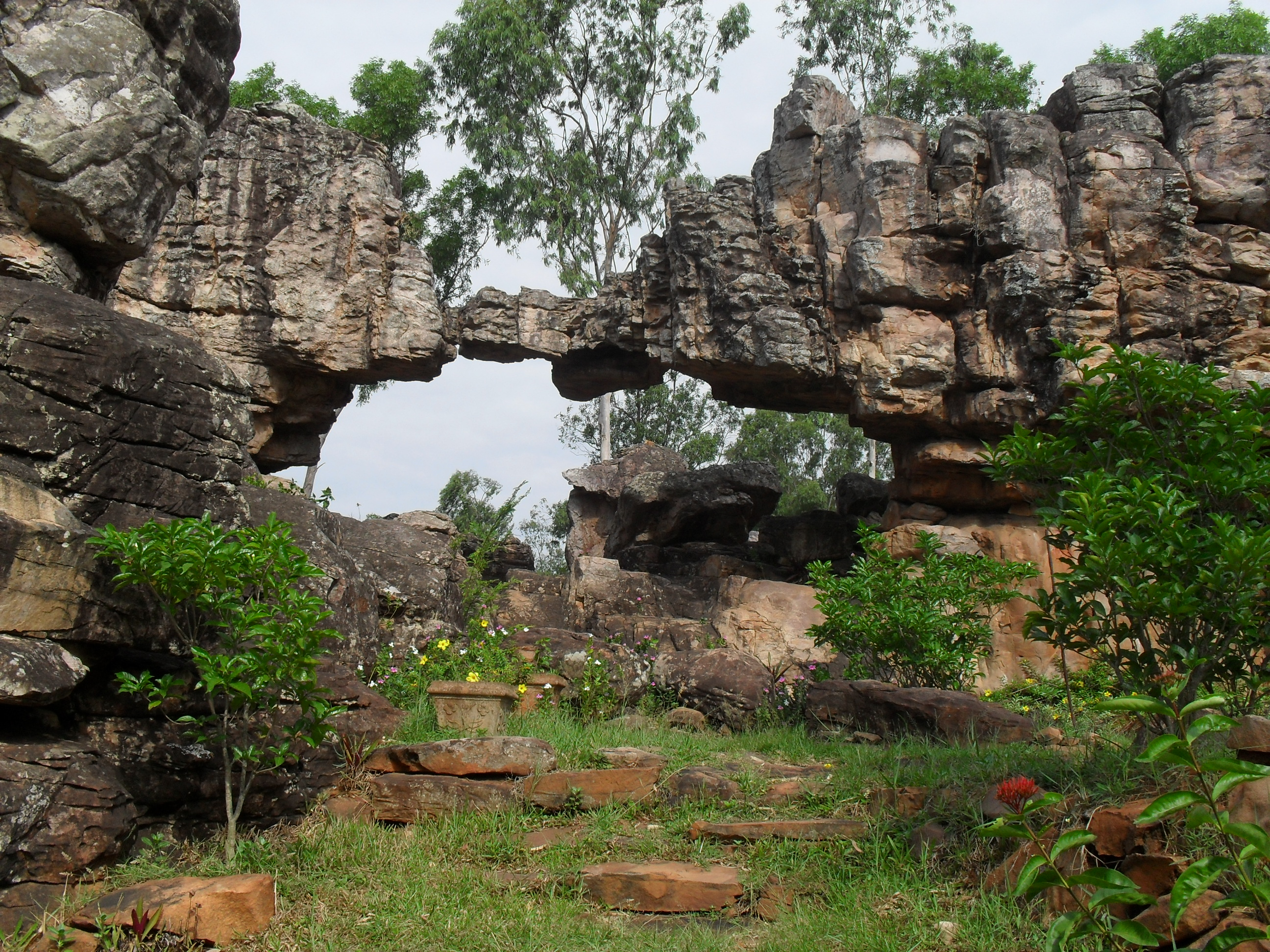
Silathoranam in Tirumala Hills

Tirumala is located atop the Venkata hill in the Sapthagiri range in the Seshachalam Hills of the Eastern Ghats. Spread over an area of 26.8 km^{2} (10.33 mi^{2}), it is located about 980 m (3,220 ft) above sea level, in the Tirupati district of Andhra Pradesh. The Sapthagiri consists of seven hills including Venkatadri on which Tirumala resides, and is surrounded by the other six hills–Seshadri, Neeladri, Garudadri, Anjanadri, Vrushabhadri, and Narayanadri. The hills are situated in the Seshachalam Hills biosphere which houses the Venkateswara National Park, and is surrounded by deciduous forests, which are home to several flora and fauna. There are several streams and waterfalls in the hills.

The Eparchaean Unconformity at Tirumala is a major discontinuity of stratigraphic significance and is declared as a National Geological Monument by the Geological Survey of India. It represents a meeting point in the geological history of the Earth where Archean gneisses formed over 2.5 billion years ago meet sedimentary rocks of the Proterozoic era of the Kadapa sub-group. The Silathoranam is a natural arch formation located in the hills. The 3 m (9.8 ft) tall and 8 m (26 ft) wide rock arch was formed by consistent erosion of the underlying quartzite rock, and is dated to more than 1.5 billion years old.

=== Climate ===
Tirumala has a hot and humid tropical climate. The temperatures reach the maximum from late March to early June with an average daily temperature of 34 °C (94 °F). May is the hottest month of the year with an average high of 37 °C (98 °F) and an average low of 22 °C (72 °F). The winter season extends from November to January with an average daily temperature of 27 °C (81 °F). December is the coldest month of the year with an average high of 25 °C (77 °F) and an average low of 13 °C (56 °F). Tirumala experiences some rainfall for at lease nine months of the year. It receives the maximum rainfall during the northeast monsoon in November.

Climate data for Tirumala (1991–2020)
Month	Jan	Feb	Mar	Apr	May	Jun	Jul	Aug	Sep	Oct	Nov	Dec	Year
Record high °C (°F)	31.1 (88.0)	33.4 (92.1)	35.8 (96.4)	37.0 (98.6)	37.6 (99.7)	36.8 (98.2)	34.0 (93.2)	34.0 (93.2)	35.4 (95.7)	30.4 (86.7)	29.8 (85.6)	27.4 (81.3)	37.6 (99.7)
Mean daily maximum °C (°F)	24.0 (75.2)	27.0 (80.6)	30.6 (87.1)	32.3 (90.1)	33.3 (91.9)	30.6 (87.1)	29.0 (84.2)	28.0 (82.4)	28.2 (82.8)	26.4 (79.5)	24.3 (75.7)	22.9 (73.2)	28.2 (82.8)
Mean daily minimum °C (°F)	14.0 (57.2)	15.0 (59.0)	17.1 (62.8)	20.5 (68.9)	22.1 (71.8)	21.7 (71.1)	20.9 (69.6)	20.7 (69.3)	20.1 (68.2)	18.9 (66.0)	17.4 (63.3)	15.6 (60.1)	18.6 (65.5)
Record low °C (°F)	7.3 (45.1)	8.0 (46.4)	8.6 (47.5)	15.0 (59.0)	15.8 (60.4)	13.6 (56.5)	15.2 (59.4)	13.0 (55.4)	17.2 (63.0)	12.4 (54.3)	11.6 (52.9)	7.5 (45.5)	7.3 (45.1)
Average rainfall mm (inches)	5.3 (0.21)	5.6 (0.22)	7.2 (0.28)	16.7 (0.66)	64.9 (2.56)	95.4 (3.76)	107.4 (4.23)	157.3 (6.19)	112.2 (4.42)	216.9 (8.54)	292.9 (11.53)	147.8 (5.82)	1,229.8 (48.42)
Average rainy days	0.3	0.3	0.5	1.3	3.2	5.6	7.0	7.7	6.9	9.9	10.3	4.7	57.7
Average relative humidity (%) (at 17:30 IST)	76	65	55	61	59	67	69	71	72	80	84	84	70
Source: India Meteorological Department

== Demographics and administration ==
As per the 2011 Census, Tirumala had a population of 7,741 of which 3,970 were males and 3,771 were females. About 9.6% of the population was below the age of six years. The literacy rate was 85.72%, higher than the national average of 59.5%. The male literacy rate was 91.33% percent while the female literacy was 79.82%. Hindus formed the majority with 96.95% of the population.

Though Tirumala is classified as a gram panchayat, it does not have an elected body. It is managed by the Tirumala Tirupati Devasthanams, a special purpose body established for the administration of the town. A village secretariat was established in 2021 to impart government services to the residents.

== Culture and religious significance ==
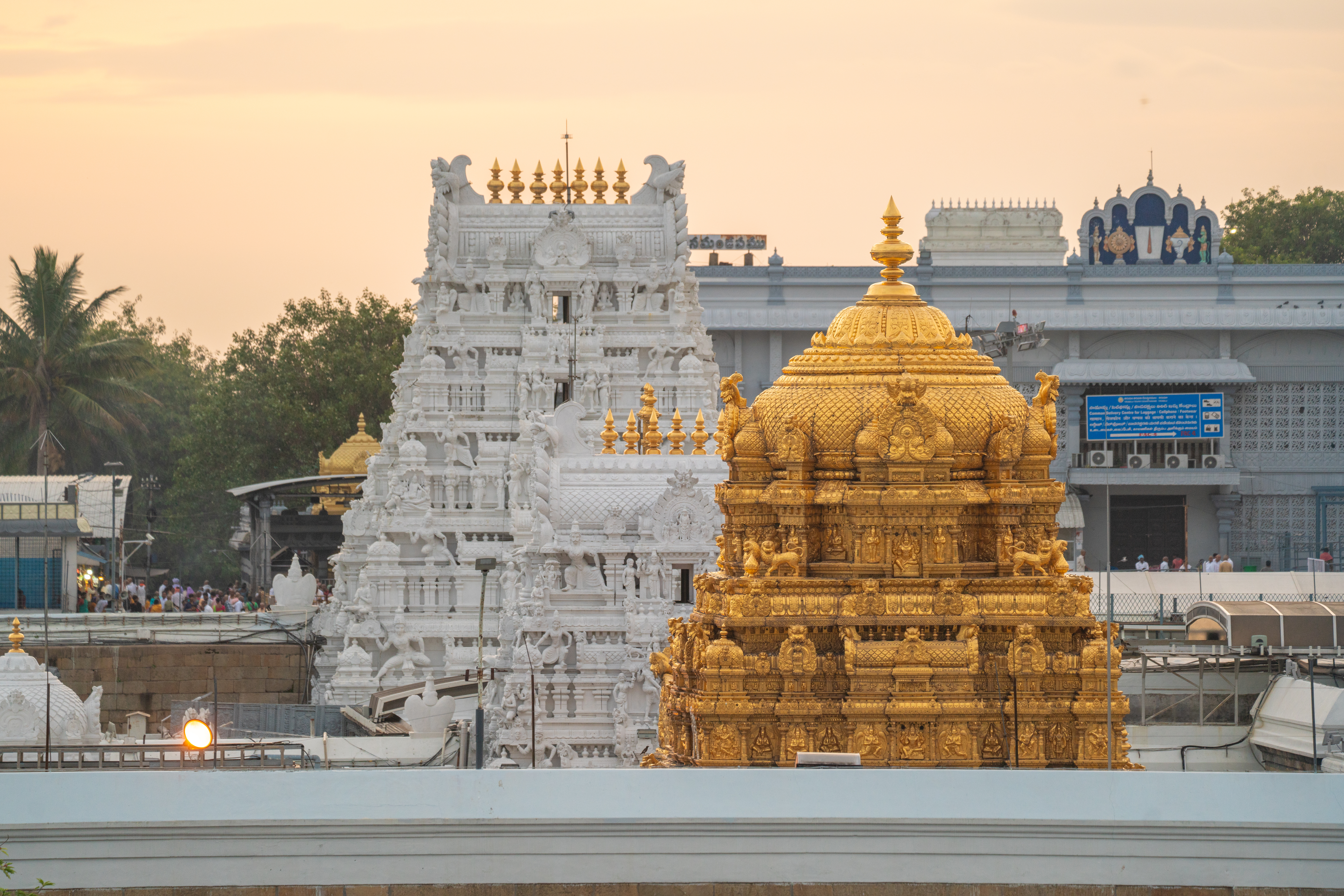
View of the main gopuram and vimana of the Venkateswara Temple, Tirumala

The Venkateswara Temple is dedicated to Venkateswara, a form of Vishnu. The temple is a major Hindu religious site, and is one of the foremost sites of Vaishnavism. The temple is associated with Venkateswara and his marriage to Padmavati. The murti is depicted as standing upright, and has a huge namam on his forehead. His right hand is held in a varadamudra pose, a gesture that symbolises granting of wishes in Hinduism. There is a statue of Lakshmi on his chest. The deity is said to have the ability to grant the wishes of the devotees and absolve them of their sins. Hence, the temple attracts millions of visitors annually, and is one of the most visited temples in India. It receives over ₹14 billion (US$150 million) annually, and with assets of over ₹3 trillion (US$31 billion), it is one of the richest temples in India.

"Srivari Padalu" (Sri Vari's footprints), located near the temple, are a set of footprints believed to be that of Venkateswara, formed when he first set foot on the Tirumala Hills. Sri Venkateswara Museum at Tirumala exhibits a collection of historical artifacts, idols, and religious items. It also has a photo gallery that displays the region's culture and traditions.

=== Practices and festivals ===
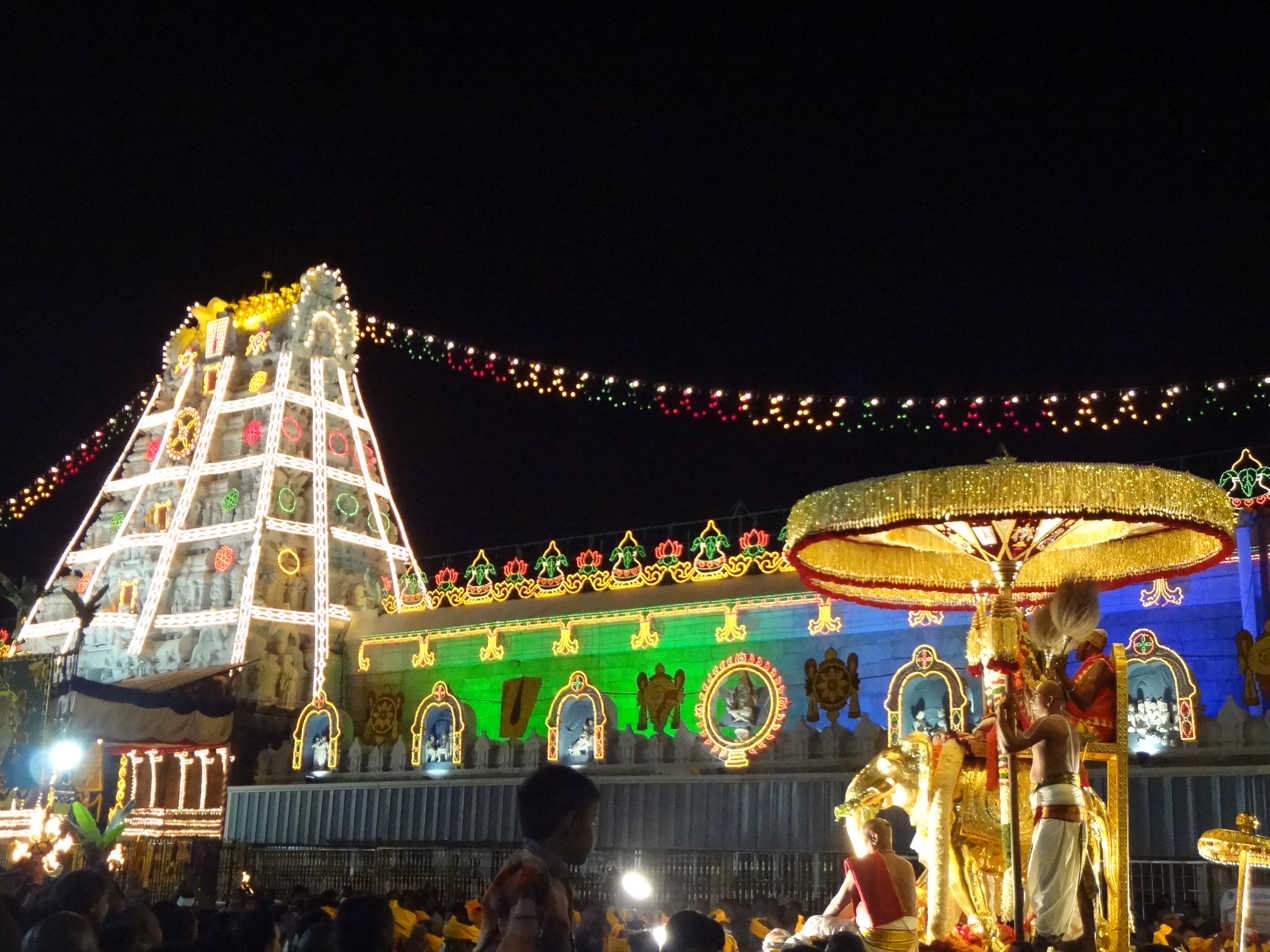
Venkateswara on a horse mount during Srivari Brahmotsavam

Pilgrims often tonsure their heads as an offering to the god for fulfilling their vows. Pilgrims also walk from Tirupati to Tirumala, and do a pradakshna around the temple as homage to the deity. Tirupati laddu, is a special type of laddu, an Indian sweet, which is offered as a prasadam at temple. The laddus are manufactured exclusively by the Tirumala Tirupati Devasthanams and is a recognised unique geographical indication in India. The town is strictly vegetarian, and consumption of non-vegetarian food, liquor, and tobacco products is strictly prohibited and punishable by law.

Srivari Brahmotsavam is the important festival in Tirumala and is celebrated over a period of nine days during the month of Aswayujamu or Purattasi (September–October). On Vaikunta Ekadasi annually, the Vaikuntha dvaram (door to Vaikuntha) will be opened, which symbolises the entry to the abode of Vishnu. Rathasapthami is celebrated during the month of Magha, and the Malayappa Swami, the utsava murti, is taken in a procession around the temple on seven different vahanas (mounts) on the day. Other major Hindu festivals including Sankranti, and Ugadi are also celebrated in the temple.

== Infrastructure and transport ==
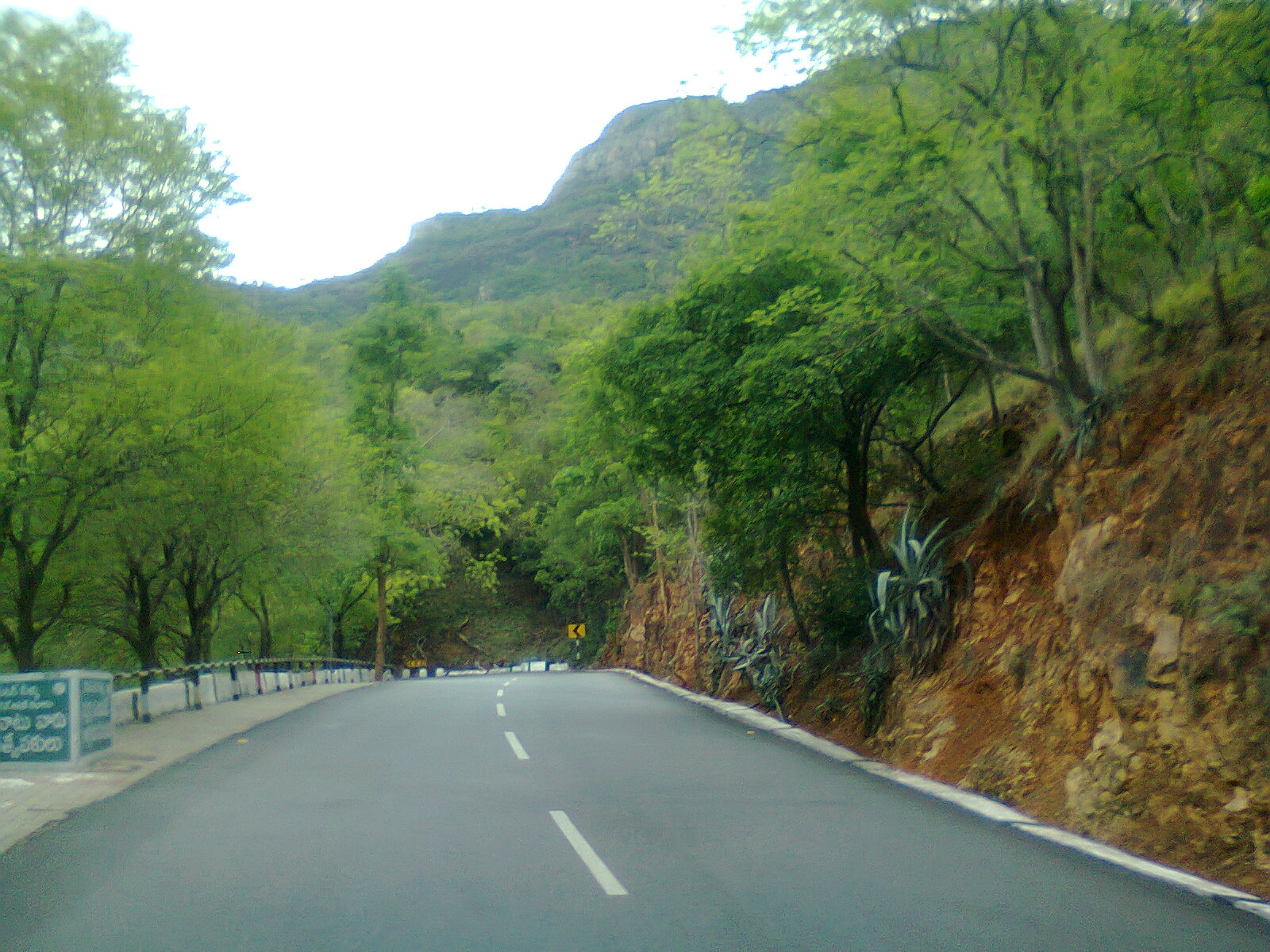
Tirupati–Tirumala ghat road

The Tirumala ghat roads are a pair of roads that connect Alipiri, a neighbourhood of Tirupati with Tirumala. The two-lane roads are tolled and stretch 18 km (11 mi) and 17.8 km (11.1 mi), and are used for downward and upward traffic respectively. The roads are open for 21 hours a day and closed from 12 am to 3 am. They handle approximately 10,000 vehicles use the roads everyday, with the count higher on special and festival days. The state owned Andhra Pradesh State Road Transport Corporation (APSRTC) operates bus services from four bus stations in Tirupati to Tirumala. APSRTC and Tirumala Tirupati Devasthanams operate free buses for transit within Tirumala.

There are two footpaths to Tirumala from Tirupati. Locally known as "Sopanamargas", one stretches 7.8 km (4.8 mi) and connects Alipiri with Tirumala and the other steeper path stretches 2.1 km (1.3 mi) and connects Srivarimettu with Tirumala. The devotees often travel on foot as a form of penance or offering to the god for fulfilling their vows. The paths are completely roofed.

The nearest railway station is the Tirupati Main railway station, located 26 km (16 mi) from Tirumala. It lies on the Gudur–Katpadi section and is part of the South Central Railway zone of the Indian Railways. The Tirupati Airport is located about 15 km (9.3 mi) from Tirumala, and has connections to major domestic destinations such as Bengaluru, Chennai, Delhi, and Hyderabad.

== See also ==
- Hindu Temples in Tirupati
- Sacred mountains
