= Agama =

== Religion ==
- Āgama (Buddhism), a collection of Early Buddhist texts
- Āgama (Hinduism), scriptures of several Hindu sects
- Jain literature (Jain Āgamas), various canonical scriptures in Jainism

== Other uses ==
- Agama (lizard), a genus of lizards in the family Agamidae
  - Agama agama, a species of lizard from the family Agamidae
- Religion, referred to as agama in the Malay-speaking world (Indonesia, Malaysia, Singapore, Brunei)
- Parthenogenesis or agamic, a form of asexual reproduction not involving the fusion of male and female gametes
- Agama Yoga is a yoga school founded by Swami Vivekananda Saraswati, a Romanian yoga instructor born as Narcis Tarcău

== See also ==
- Agam (disambiguation)
