= Agam Wispi =

Indonesian poet

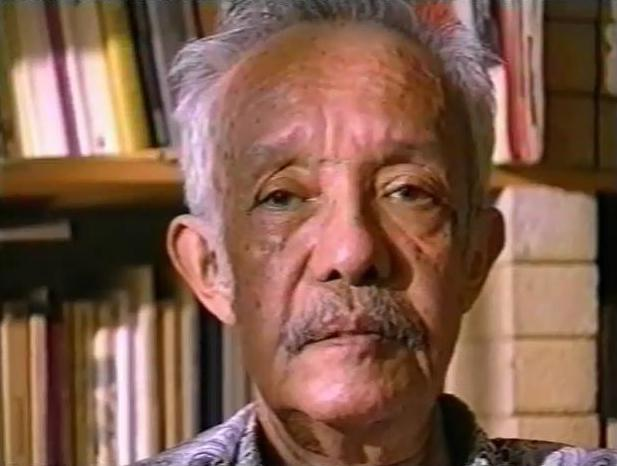
- Agam Wispi, 1990s
- Born: December 31, 1930; Pangkalan Susu, North Sumatra, Dutch East Indies
- Died: January 1, 2003 (aged 72); Amsterdam, Netherlands
- Citizenship: Netherlands
- Writing career
- Language: Indonesia
- Genre: Poetry
- Subject: Literature

Agam Wispi is an Indonesian poet.

== Biography ==
Agam Wispi, the poet, was born in Pangkalan Susu, North Sumatra in 1930. He was influenced by his father, who was associated with Gezaksa, one of the most well-known theater troupes prior to World War II. Wispi began his writing career with the poem Merdeka Bernoda (Stained Freedom) which was published in the Kerakyatan, a daily newspaper in Medan. He went on to work at the Kerakyatan as a journalist and cultural editor. It was while working for the Kerakyatan that he was introduced to the progressive ideas of the People's Cultural Organization, the LEKRA, which gradually influenced his writing. He became a formal member and manager at LEKRA in 1959. The LEKRA works "Dinasti 650 Juta" (1961) and "Yang Tak Terbungkamkan" (1961) include several of his poems. Wispi believed his fate had been largely shaped by poetry, citing as evidence the publication of his first poem by Kerakyatan, and the significant role a later poem, about Badbo Bay, Vietnam, played in determining his fate. During the later years, he was also inspired by Ho Chi Minh, whom he met in Hanoi when he was in Vietnam in 1965.

In 1965, he was invited to Vietnam after the successful translation and publication of the poem about Bakbo Bay in a Vietnamese literary magazine. He traveled the country and was given the opportunity to meet Ho Chi Minh in Hanoi. In September 1965 he was in Beijing when he learned of the alleged abortive coup in Jakarta. Being a member of LEKRA, he was compelled to stay back in Vietnam and was exiled for five years in Nanking. His writings during this time period were called as "Catatan Nanking". Unable to return to Indonesia he then continued to live in China. He also lived for a time in East Germany, where he studied German literature, worked in a library, and started translating Faust, which was later published by Kalam, Jakarta in 1999. The events of 1965 separated Wispi from his wife and children, who continued to live in Jakarta, and although Wispi did return to Indonesia in 1996, his final years were spent living in the Netherlands, where he died in 2003. Despite having become a Dutch citizen and carrying a Dutch passport, Wispi always maintained he was still Indonesian.

He has several major works to his credit, like "Repolusi", "Dera dan Deru" (1957), "Demokrasi", the poetry compilation "Sahabat" (1959), and a one-act drama "Gerbong" (1958). His writings in exile include "Exile", "Orang-orang yang Dilupakan" and "Kronologi in Memoriam". Wispi's poems written during his exile period are included in "Di Negeri Orang- Puisi Penyair Indonesia Eksil" (On Foreign Shores- Poems by Exiled Indonesian Poets), published in 2002, which is an anthology of poets and writers in exile.

Even during exile, Wispi remained creatively active and produced significant works. His play, "Gerbong" ('Boxcar') was staged by Lekra, in association with Medan Lesdra performing group (Lembaga Seni Drama, Institute of Dramatic Art). Lekra-Lesdra participated in All North Sumatra Drama Festival in 1957, where the Medan Lekra-affiliated theater group, Dinamo (Dynamo) presented Wispi's play and managed to reach the finals of the festival.

After his return to Indonesia in 1996, Wispi wrote "Pulang", another collection of his poems. He is the author of several collections of poetry.

== Publications ==
- Wispi, Agam (1959). Sahabat, pilihan sadjak² (in Indonesian). Jakarta: Bagian Penerbitan, Lembaga Kebudajaan Rakjat. OCLC 32342014.
- Wispi, Agam (1960). Jang tak terbungkamkan (in Indonesian). Jakarta: Lekra. OCLC 32342001.
- Wispi, Agam (1961). Dinasti 650 djuta : pilihan sadjak-sadjak (in Indonesian). Jakarta: Bagian Penerbitan Lembaga Kebudajaan Rakjat. OCLC 69262375.
- Wispi, Agam (1961). Api '26 (in Indonesian). Jakarta: Jajasan Pembaruan. OCLC 23575446.
- Wispi, Agam (1962). Matinja seorang petani (in Indonesian). Jakarta: Lembaga Kebudajaan Rakjat. OCLC 84867684.
- Wispi, Agam (1964). 勇敢的年代 [Yong gan di nian dai] (in Chinese). Beijing: Zuo jia chu ban she. OCLC 34917181.
- Wispi, Agam (1968). Indonesian people take Mao Tse-tung's road : anthology. Colombo: Afro-Asian Writers' Bureau. OCLC 2069062.
- Wispi, Agam (1974). Jang tak terbungkamkan (in Indonesian). Jakarta: Zug : Inter Documentation Co. OCLC 220247129.
- Wispi, Agam (1999). Faust : diterjemakhan dari bahasa Jerman oleh (in Indonesian). Jakarta: Kalam. ISBN 9789799548047. OCLC 50979383.
- Wispi, Agam (2004). On the record : Indonesian literary figures (in Indonesian and English). Jakarta: Yayasan Lontar. OCLC 224574504.
