= Varadamudra =

Hand gesture in Indian religions

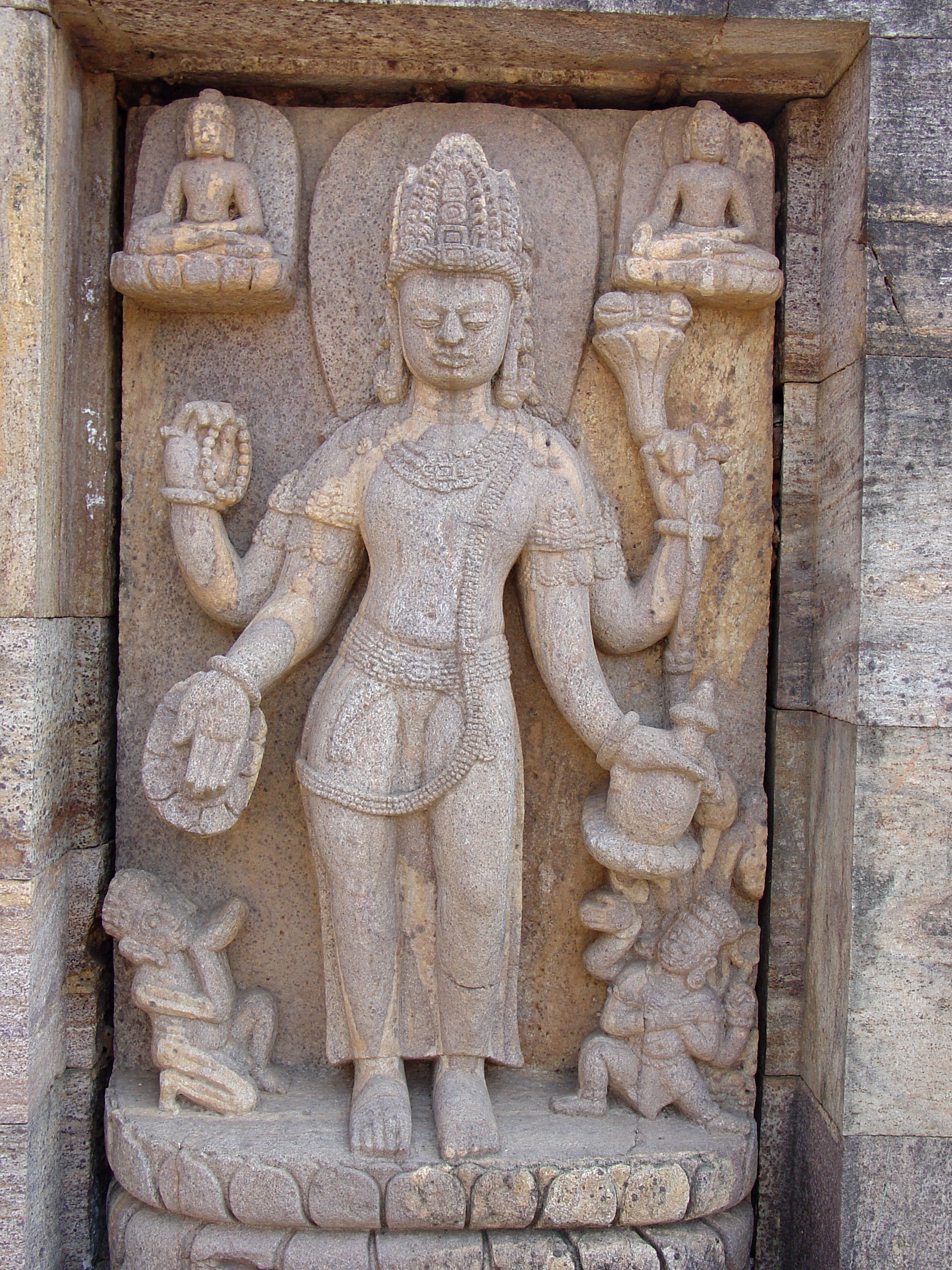
A four-armed bodhisattva, the lower right hand displaying varada mudra

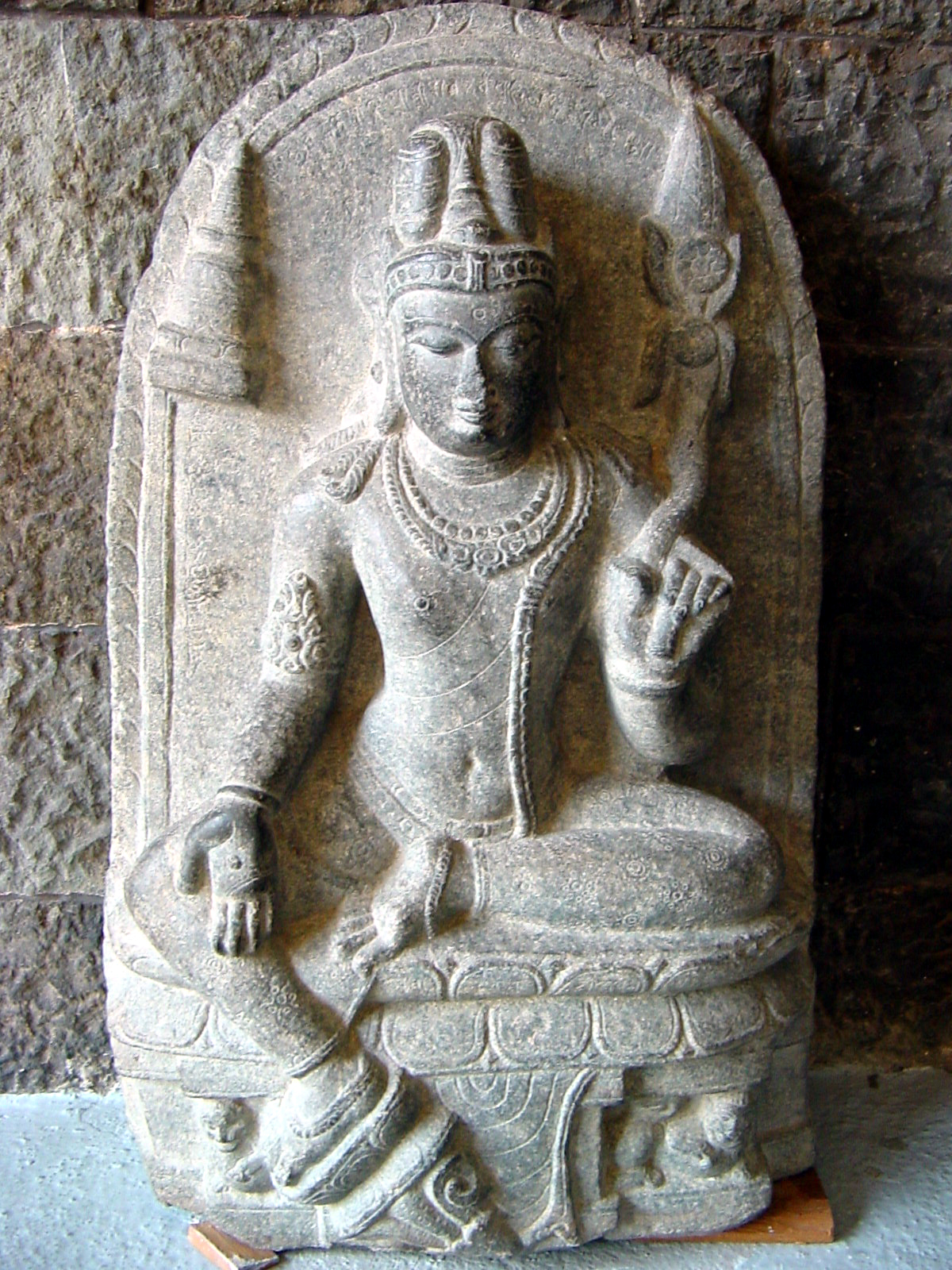
Bodhisattva making varadamudra. Pala period, 12th century.

The varadamudra (Sanskrit: वरदमुद्रा, romanized: varadamudrā) often translated as wish-granting mudra or wish-bestowing mudra, is a symbolic gesture featured in the iconography of Indian religions. It indicates a gesture by the hand and symbolises dispensing of boons. It is represented by the palm held outward, with the fingers outstretched and pointing downwards. Sometimes, the thumb and the index finger meet, forming a circle.

The varadamudra and the abhayamudra are among the most common mudras depicted in the iconography of Hindu and Buddhist traditions.
