= List of Hindu temples in Tirupati =

Tirupati is a city in Tirupati district of the Indian state of Andhra Pradesh. It is a municipal corporation and the headquarters of Tirupati district.

Tirupati is home to world-famous Vaishnavite shrine Venkateswara Temple and many other Hindu temples.

== List ==
Name of the temple	Deity	Location	Picture	Timeline	Description
Venkateswara Temple	Venkateswara	Tirumala		500-1000 CE	Tirumala Venkateswara Temple is one of the world's richest and famous Vaishnavite temple dedicated to Lord Venkateswara. The temple is situated at an elevation of 853 metres on Tirumala Hills of Seshachalam Hill ranges.
Padmavathi Temple	Padmavati	Tiruchanur			Sri Padmavathi Temple at Tiruchanur is the temple dedicated to Goddess Alamelu (Padmavathi) or Alamelumanga, the wife of Lord Venkateswara. Tiruchanur, a suburb of Tirupati is at a distance of 5 km. There is also a temple dedicated to Lord Surya Narayana in front of Pushkarini.
Govindaraja Temple	Govindaraja	Tirupati		1130 CE	Govindaraja Temple is the temple dedicated to Sri Govindaraja Swamy who is believed to be brother of Lord Venkateswara. The temple was consecrated in the year 1130 AD by Vaishnavite, Saint Ramanujacharya. Before Sri Govindaraja Swamy, Sri Parthasarathy Swamy was the presiding deity of the temple. The temple was situated at the heart of the city. It has tall seven storied outer Gopuram with 11 kalasas and dated back to 14-15th century. This temple is one of the huge temples in Tirupati district.
Kapila Theertham	Kapileswara and Kamakshi	Tirupati		Unknown	Kapila Theertham is the holy water falls in Tirupati named after Kapila Muni. It hosts Kapileswara Temple which is dedicated to Lord Shiva and the deity is referred to as Kapileswara. The water falls directly fall from the hill rocks into the pond opposite to the temple. The temple and the falls are considered highly devotional. The greatness of the temple deity was found in the Kulothunga Chola Inscriptions of the 10th century.
Kodandarama Temple	Rama, Sita and Lakshmana	Tirupati		10th Century	The 10th century temple is dedicated to Lord Rama, an incarnation of Vishnu, along with Sita and Lakshmana. According to Varaha Purana, during Treta Yuga, Rama resided here along with Sita and Lakshmana on his return from Lankapuri.
Tataiahgunta gangamma Temple	Gangamma	Tirupati			Thathayyagunta Gangamma Temple is the temple dedicated to Goddess Gangamma, Gramadevata of Tirupati and sister of Lord Venkateswara. The temple is one of the ancient and is at the heart of the city. Tirupati Ganga Jatara celebrated every year in the month of May is the most auspiciuos occasion celebrated in this temple. The temple activities are looked after by Thathayya Gunta Gangamma Devastanam.
Vakula Matha Temple, Tirupati	Vakula Devi	Tirupati		17th Century	Vakula Devi is the foster mother of Lord Venkateswara. The temple in her name was built about 300 years ago on Perurubanda hillock, around the scenic Peruru, in Tirupati and located within 10 kilometers of Tirumala hills. As per the wishes of Vakula maata (mother), this temple was constructed in such a way that visage of maata faces the Seven Hills, where her son Lord Venkateswara resides.
Kalyana Venkateswara Temple	Kalyana Venkateswara	Srinivasamangapuram, Tirupati			This temple is at a distance of 12 km from Tirupati. It is believed that Lord Venkateswara stayed here for 6 months after marriage, before moving to Tirumala.
Prasanna Venkateswara Temple	Prasanna Venkateswara	Appalayagunta, Tirupati		1232 CE	This temple is at a distance of 16 km from Tirupati. The right hand(hasta) of presiding deity will be in prasanna(Abhaya-blessing) posture instead of usual varada posture in other venkateswara temples and hence the temple got the name Prasanna Venkateswara temple.
Parasurameswara Temple	Shiva	Gudimallam, Tirupati		3rd Century BCE	The Shiva Linga in this temple is supposed to be the earliest Linga discovered so far. This is one of the five ancient Shiva temples on the bank of Swarnamuki River
Agatheeswara Temple	Shiva	Tondavada(Mukkoti)			This temple is 10 km away from Tirupati. Shiva Linga in this Temple is believed to be installed by sage Agastya. This is one of the five ancient Shiva temples on the bank of Swarnamuki River.
Parasareswara Temple	Shiva	Yogimallavaram			This temple is in Tiruchanur and is 3 km away from Tirupati. This is one of the five ancient Shiva temples on the bank of Swarnamuki River
Radha Govindha Lotus Mandir(ISCKON)	Krishna, Radha and Ashtabharyas	Tirupati		1984(Old Temple) 2005(Lotus Temple)	This temple is also referred to as Lotus Temple because of its design and also as Hare Krishna Temple.
Kodandarama Temple, Chandragiri	Rama, Sita, Lakshmana, Bharata, Shatrughna, Hanuman and Garuda	Chandragiri		16th Century	A temple dedicated to Rama, where idols of Rama, Sita, Lakshmana, Bharata, Shatrughna, flanked by Hanuman and Garuda on either side can be seen on a single pedestal(Eka peetam)
Kalyana Venkateswara Temple, Narayanavanam	Sri Kalyana Venkateswara and Padmavathi thayar	Narayanavanam		16th Century	Sri Kalyana Venkateswaraswamy Temple is a Hindu-Vaishnavite temple situated at Narayanavanam, a town in Tirupati District of Andhra Pradesh state, India. The Temple is dedicated to Lord Kalyana Venkateswara, an incarnation of Vishnu. The temple is situated at 2 km east of Puttur and 45 km south of Tirupati. It is believed that Lord Venkateswara married Padmavati at this place and then moved to Tirumala.

=== Temples under TTD in Narayanavanam ===
The following temples in Narayanavanam are administered by the Tirumala Tirupati Devasthanams (TTD):

1. Sri Kalyana Venkateswaraswamy Temple - This is the main temple dedicated to Lord Venkateswara and Goddess Padmavathi. It is a significant pilgrimage site and is believed to be the location of their marriage.

2. Anjineya Temple - Located opposite to Sri Kalyana Venkateswaraswamy Temple, this temple is dedicated to Lord Hanuman.

3. Sivan Temple - Situated next to Anjineya Temple, this temple is dedicated to Lord Shiva.

4. Veerabhadra Swamy Temple - Located 500 meters from the Sri Kalyana Venkateswaraswamy Temple, this temple is dedicated to Lord Veerabhadra, a fierce form of Lord Shiva.

5. Vinayaka Temple - Situated 500 meters from the main temple, this temple is dedicated to Lord Ganesha.

6. Avitheeswaran Temple - Located 750 meters from the Sri Kalyana Venkateswaraswamy Temple, this temple is dedicated to Lord Shiva.

7. Avanakshamma Temple - Situated 800 meters from the main temple, this temple is dedicated to the local deity Avanakshamma.

== Nearby Temples ==
Srikalahasti Temple

Srikalahasti Temple is a 5th-century temple of Lord Shiva, as Kalahastiswara, situated on the banks of the River Swarnamukhi. It is 36 kilometres (22 mi) from Tirupati,(Location 13°44'59.0"N 79°41'53.7"E) and is connected by frequent buses. The renowned devotee of Lord Shiva, Kannappa, attained salvation there. It is famous for its Vayu linga, one of the Panchabhoota Sthalams, representing wind. The temple is also associated with Rahu and Kethu (of the nine grahams or celestial bodies in the Indian astrological scheme).

Kanipakam Temple

Vinayaka Temple or Sri Varasidhi Vinayaka Swamy Temple is a Hindu temple of Ganesha. It is located at Kanipakam in Chittoor district of Andhra Pradesh, India.[1] The temple is about 11 km from Chittoor and 68 km from Tirupati.

== See also ==
- Temples of Andhra Pradesh
