= Govindaraja Temple, Tirupati =

Hindu temple in Tirupati, India

Govindarajaswamy Temple, Tirupati
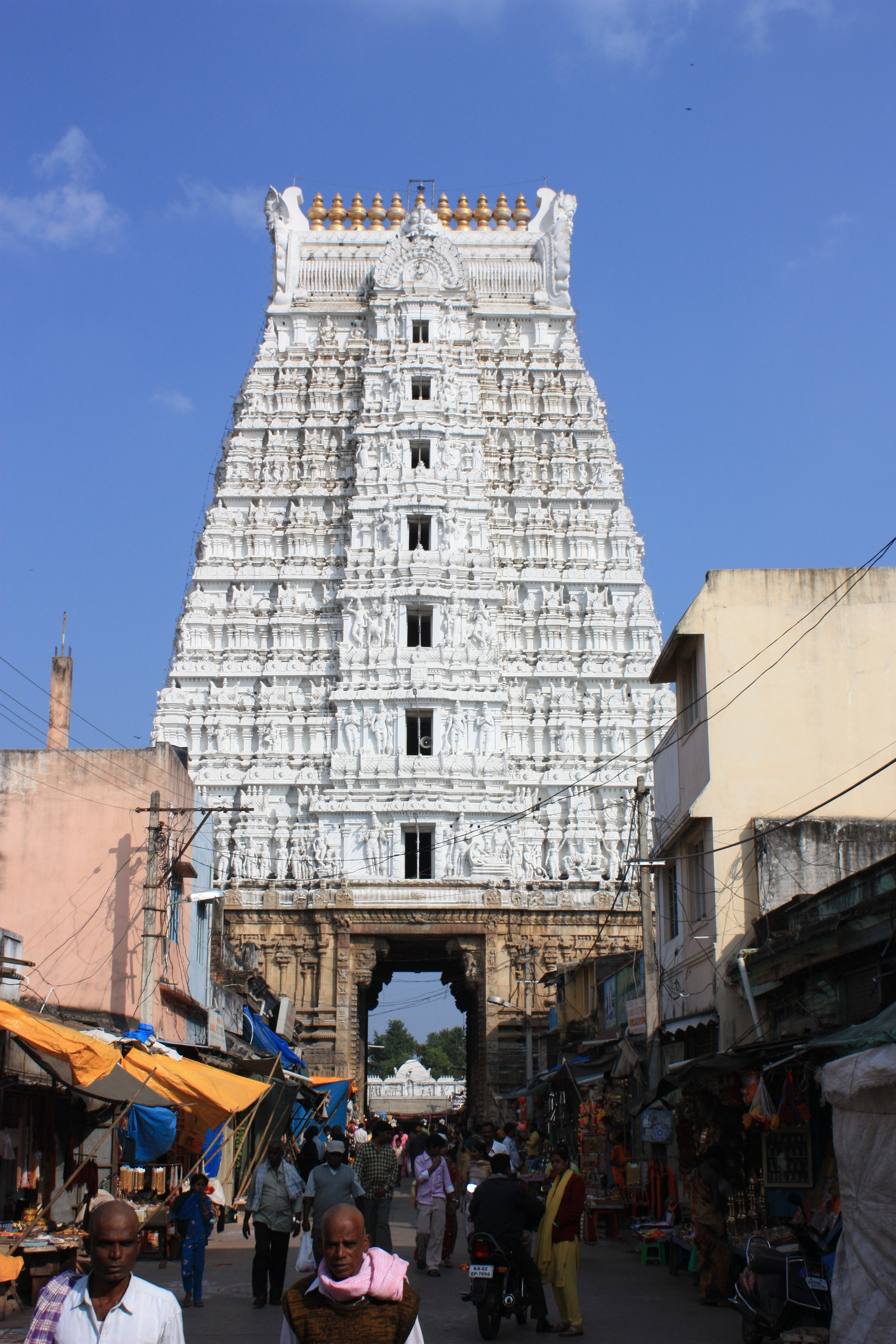
- Rajagopuram of Sri Govindarajaswamy temple, Tirupati

- Location in Andhra Pradesh

Religion
- Affiliation: Hinduism
- District: Tirupati
- Deity: moolavar: Govindaraja perumal, utsavar: Parthasarathy
- Festivals: Brahmotsavam, Vaikuntha Ekadasi
- Governing body: Tirumala Tirupati Devasthanams

Location
- Location: Tirupati
- State: Andhra Pradesh
- Country: India
- Interactive map of Govindarajaswamy Temple, Tirupati
- Coordinates: 13°40′59.7″N 79°20′49.9″E

Architecture
- Type: Dravidian architecture
- Inscriptions: Telugu and Dravidian languages

Website
- tirumala.org

Sri Govindarajaswamy Temple is an ancient Hindu Vaishnavite temple situated in the heart of Tirupati city in Tirupati district of Andhra Pradesh in India. The temple was built during 12th century and was consecrated in the year 1130 AD by Ramanuja as per the Vaikhanasa traditions, and the pancharatra jeeyar overseeing the divya prabandam recitation. The temple is one of the earliest structures in Tirupati and also one of the biggest temple complexes in the district. The Tirupati (down hill) city is built around this temple. The temple is currently administered by Tirumala Tirupati Devasthanams.

== Legend ==
It is believed that during invasion of Govindaraja Perumal Temple in Chidambaram, the Utsava murti (processional deity) was brought to Tirupati for safe keeping. The Utsava murti was taken back after the invasions.

== History ==
Govindaraja Temple was consecrated in the year 1130 AD by saint Ramanuja. However, there are structures inside the temple complex which belong to 9th and 10th centuries. Before Govindaraja was consecrated as the presiding deity, another form of Vishnu - Parthasarathy enjoyed that honour. Kotturu, a village at the foot of Tirumala hills, was moved to the vicinity of Govindaraja Temple which was later merged into city of Tirupati.

== Presiding Deity ==
The temple is dedicated to the god Vishnu, who is referred to as Govindaraja-swamy. The deity is in reclining yoga nidra posture, facing east, with his right hand under his head and left hand straight over his body. Vishnu's consorts Sridevi and Bhudevi are seated at his feet. In some texts, Govindaraja is mentioned as the elder brother of Venkateshwara, a form of Vishnu whose chief temple is in Tirupati.

== Architecture ==
The temple is one of the largest temple complexes in Andhra Pradesh. A 50 m high, seven-storied Rajagopuram was constructed on the east entrance of the temple by Matla Anantaraja, a local chieftain. This structure has Ramayana scenes and portrait of Matla Anantaraja and his three wives carved onto the passage walls. Towards the west of Rajagopuram, there are two enclosures of the temple, arranged one behind the other. The outer enclosure hosts sub shrines of the consort of Govindaraja - Pundarikavalli (a form of Lakshmi) and Alvars. The inner enclosure hosts the main shrine of Govindaraja along with shrines of Krishna with his consort, Andal. Towards south west corner of the inner enclosure, there is a shrine dedicated to Kalyana Venkateswara which had a mandapa with finely finished colonettes on the outerpiers and with central space lined with yalis projecting inwards. The pavilion in the middle had columns of grey green granite and wooden roof.

Besides Govindaraja, the shrines of Parthasarathy (the former presiding deity) and Kalyana Venkateswara are considered religiously significant.

Govindaraja temple also has shrines of goddess Padmavati, Ramanuja and Andal near the entrance. There is a structure housing the Vishnu avatars to the right side of the entrance as like common in other Vishnu temples. There are also shrines dedicated to Chakratalwar, Lakshmi Narayana, Anjaneya and Tirumala Nambi.

== Administration ==
The temple at present is being administered by Tirumala Tirupati Devasthanams and follows the vaikhanasa vadakalai mode of worship, but the rights of the temple belong to the tenkalai jeeyar of Tirumala Thirupati. The tenkalai tradition has more influence here then other 2 temples.

== Gallery ==
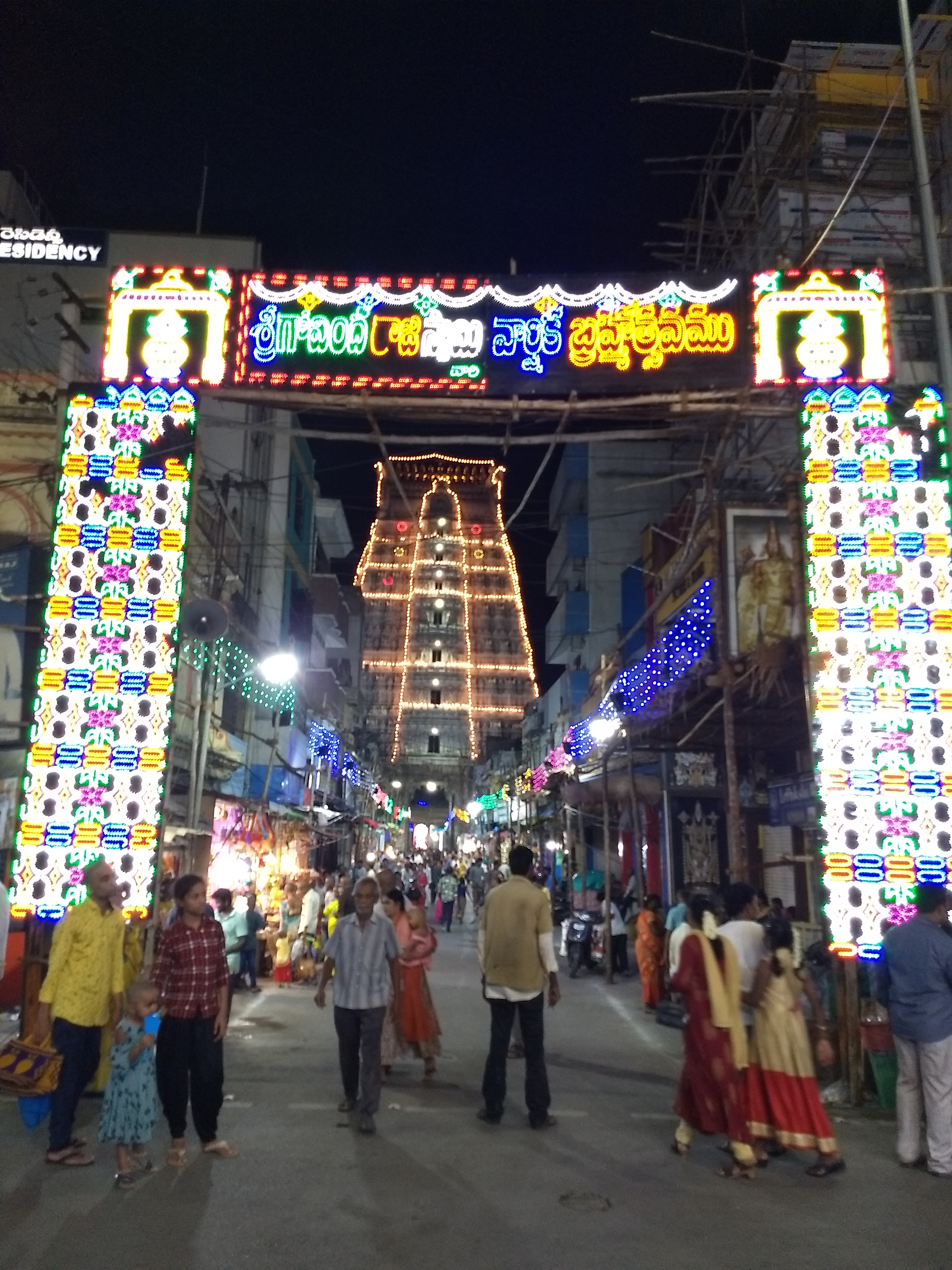
Govindaraja temple in lights during brahmotsavams

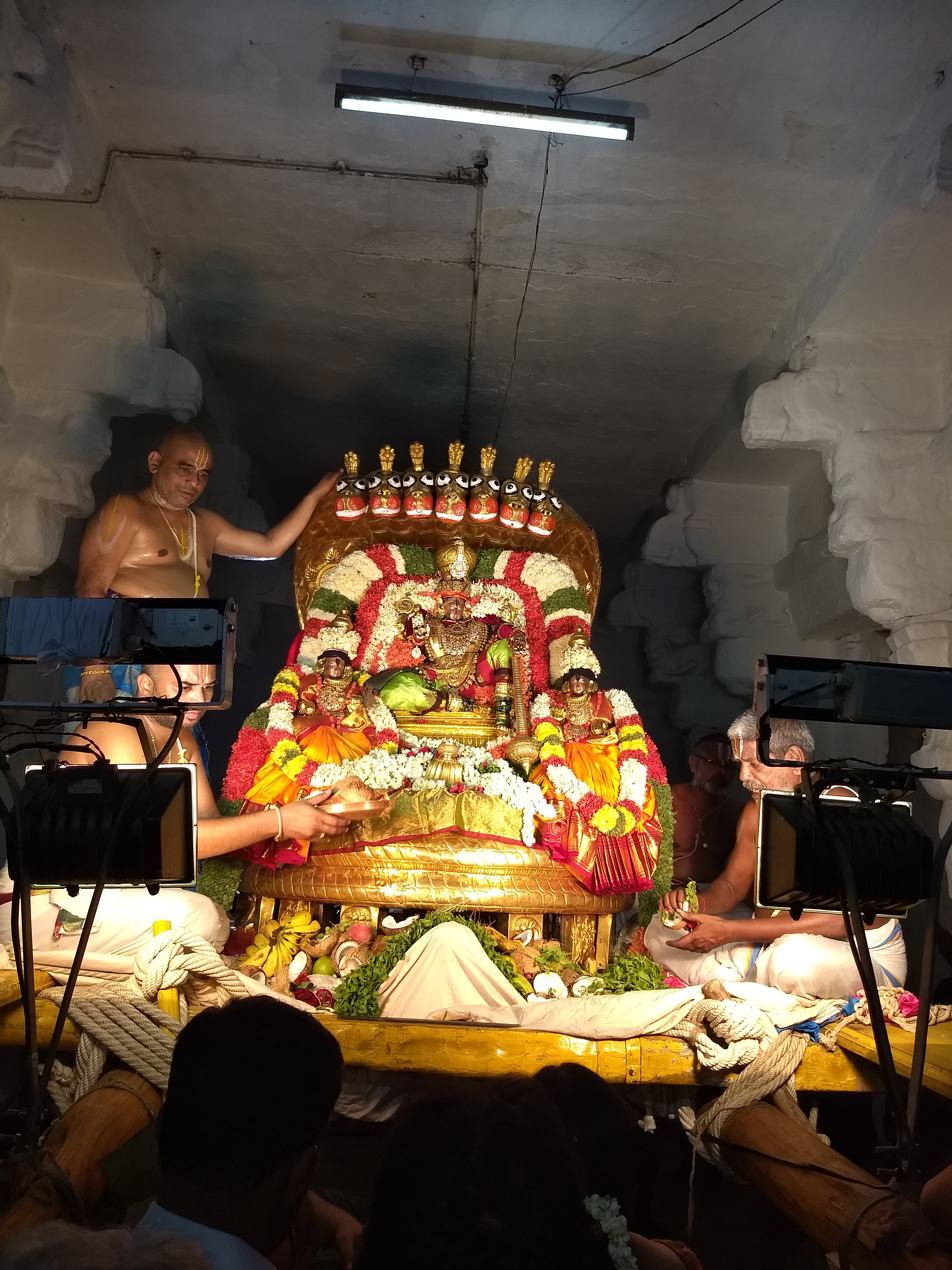
Govindaraja processional deity along with Sridevi and Bhudevi on Pedda sesha vahanam during brahmotsavams

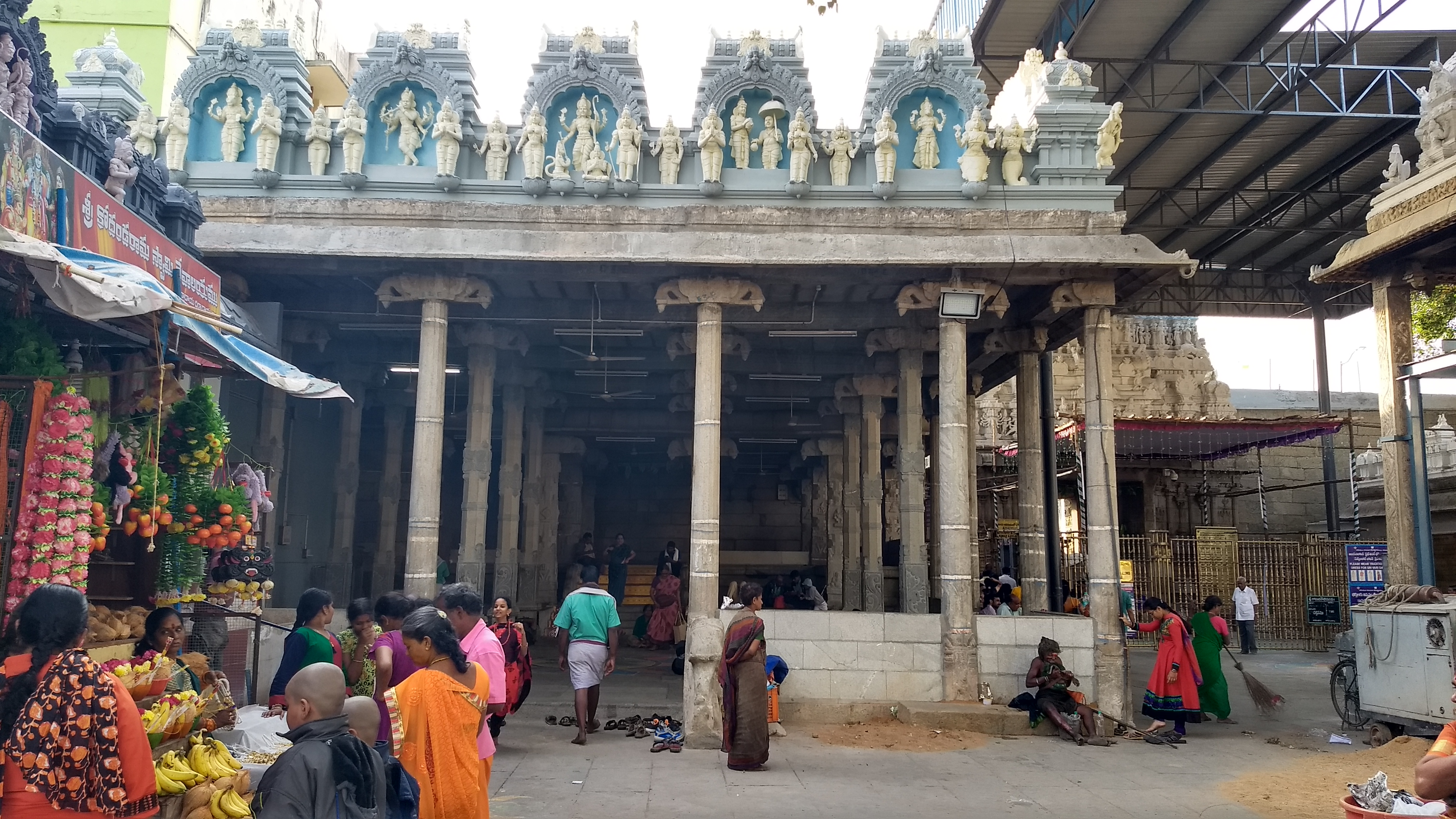
Unjal Mandapam of govindharaja Temple

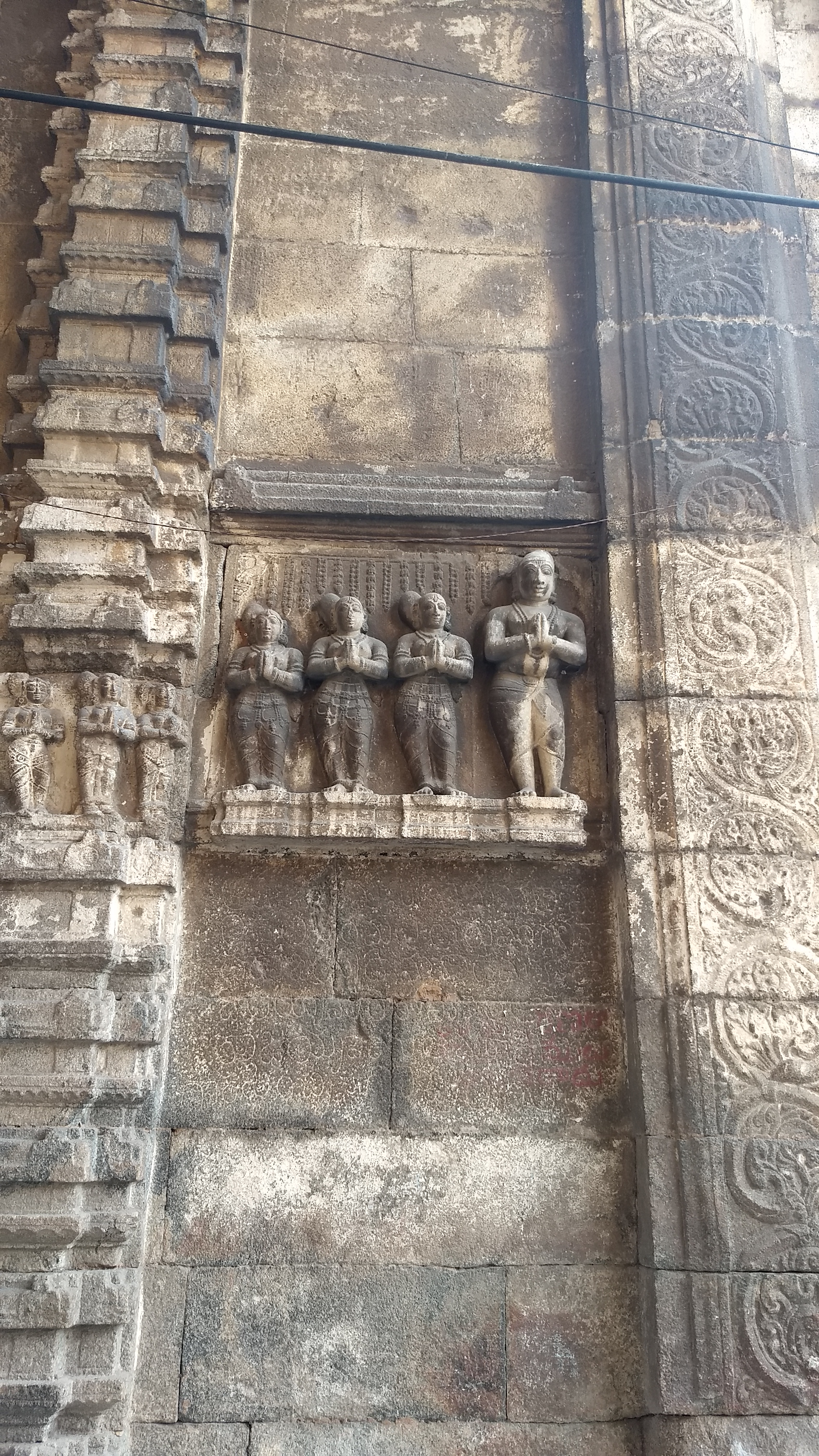
Matlaanantha Raju and his family at rajagopuram govindharaja Temple

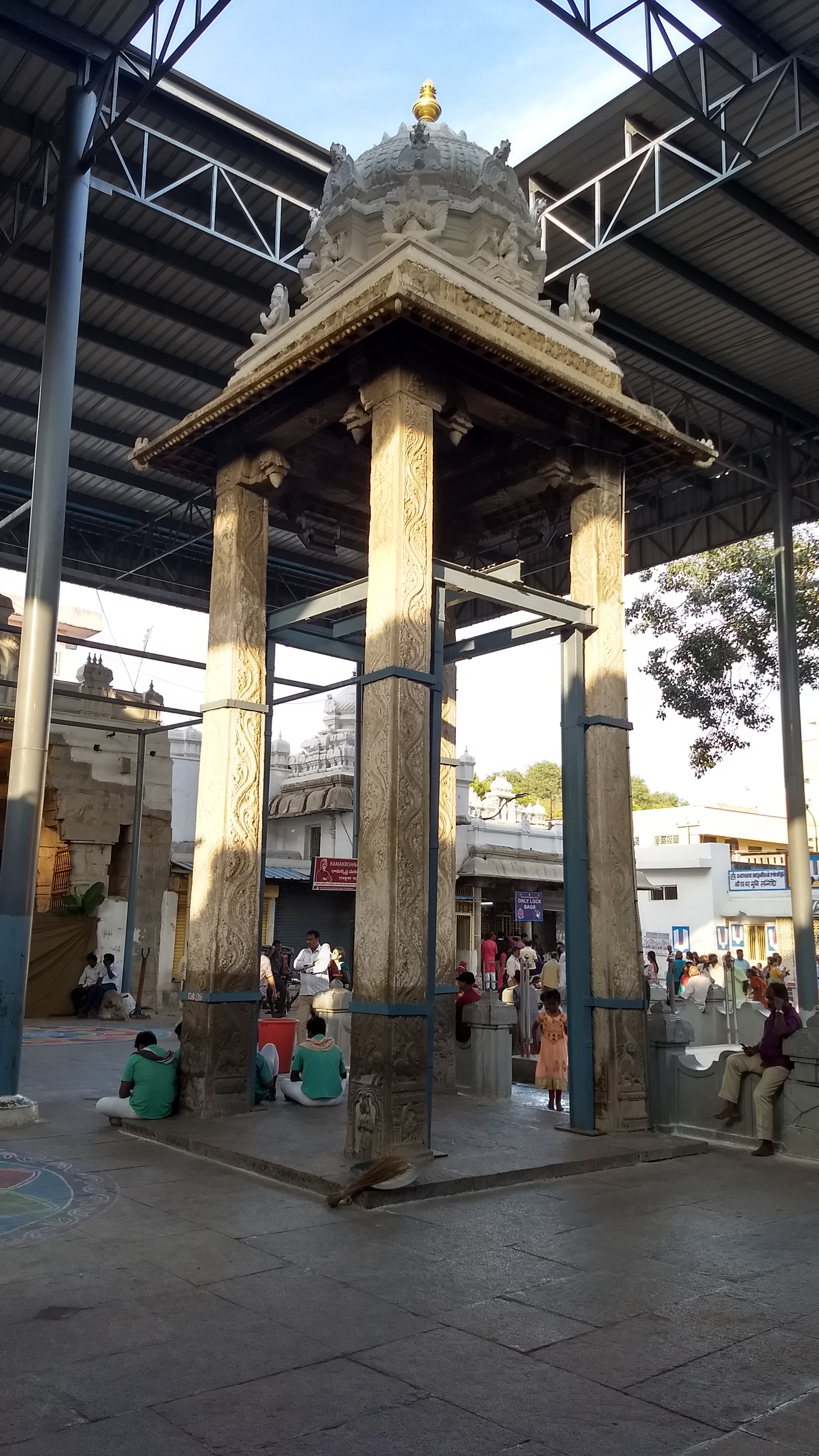
A four pillared Mandapam in front of Govindaraja Temple

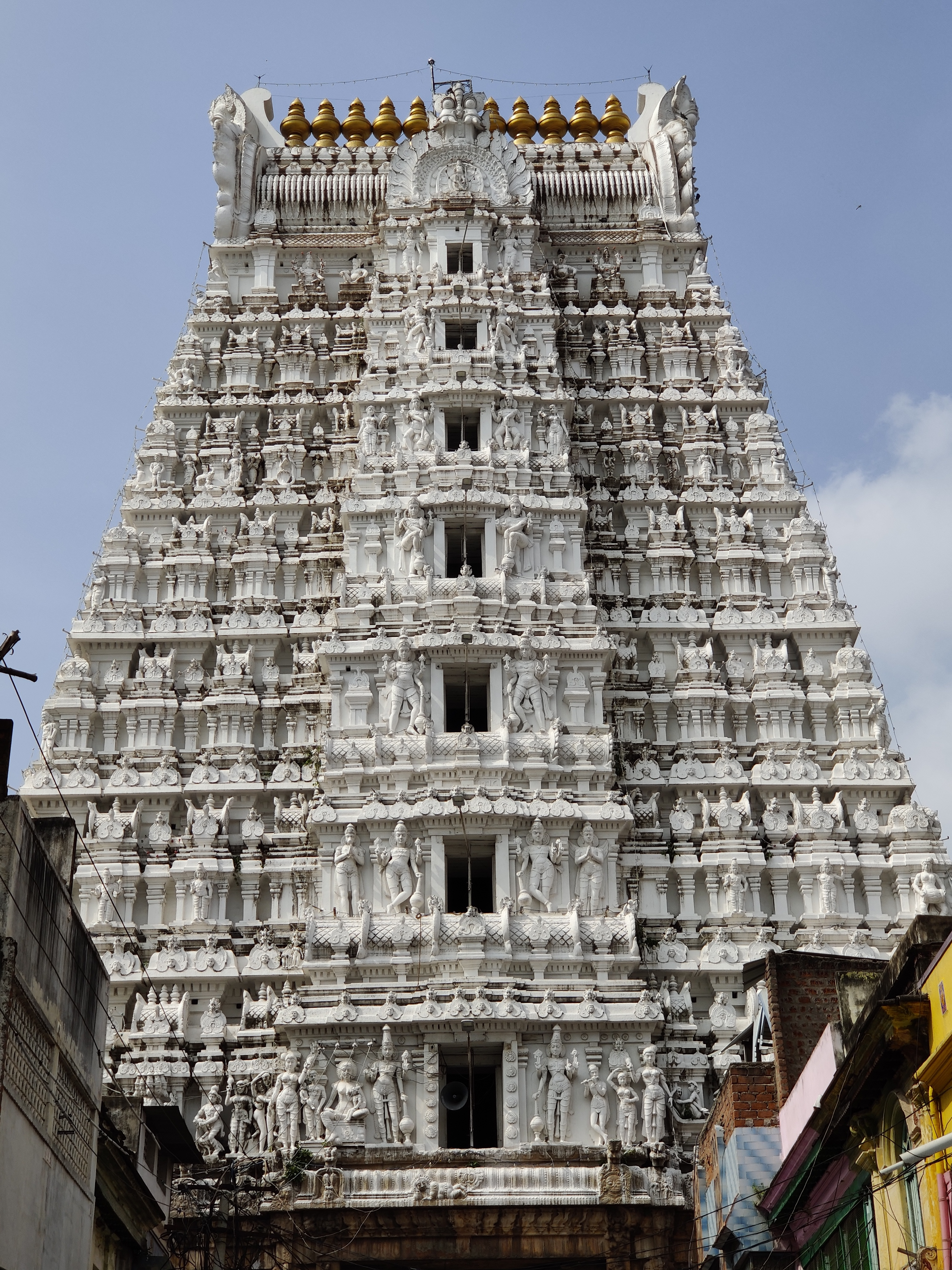
Rajagopuram of the temple

== See also ==
- Hindu Temples in Tirupati
- List of temples under Tirumala Tirupati Devasthanams
- Govindaraja Perumal Temple, Chidambaram
