= Vakula Devi =

Foster-mother of Venkateshvara in Hinduism

Vakula Devi (Telugu: వకుళా దేవి, romanized: Vakuḷā dēvi,Sanskrit: वकुलदेवी, romanized: Vakuladevī) is the foster-mother of the Hindu god Venkateshwara, a form of Vishnu. As per the legend of Tirumala, the legend of Vakula Devi dates back to the Dwapara Yuga. In the legend, Yashoda, the foster-mother of Krishna, an avatara of Vishnu, complained to him that she could not witness his wedding with Rukmini, an avatara of Lakshmi. To this, Krishna replied he would ensure that she would get such an opportunity to see his marriage to a form of Lakshmi in the Kali Yuga.

In the Kali Yuga, Vishnu has taken the form of Venkateshwara, and Yashoda was reborn as Vakula Devi, the foster-mother of Venkateshwara. As promised by the god, she arranged her foster-son's wedding with Padmavati, the foster-daughter of Akasha Raja and Dharani Rani, who was a form of Lakshmi.

== Vakula Devi Temple, Tirupati ==
The Vakula Devi Temple is situated in Tirupati city, Andhra Pradesh. It was built 5000 years ago when Tirupati was founded in 3000 BCE and it was destroyed 300 years ago in the 17th century CE on Peruru Banda hillock, around Peruru in Tirupati and was renovated from 2011 to 2022. 50 acres of land is devoted to the temple, and it is located 10 kilometres away from Tirumala and 5 kilometres from Tiruchanur. This temple was constructed in such a way that visage of Vakula Devi faces the seven hills, where her foster-son Venkateshvara is residing.

The naivedyam (offering of consecrated food) is first offered to Vakula Devi before Venkateshvara at Tirumala.

=== Destruction and negligence ===
Post-independence, the temple has been the object of neglect by the Tirumala Tirupati Devasthanams (TTD), its lackadaisical attitude best reflected in its E.O.'s statement, "The basic reason for exclusion of the temple by TTD lies in G.O. (Government order) of 1987 CE which has not listed the Vakula Devi temple among those that TTD shall look after.". It is a subject of concern for many that TTD ignores the foster-mother of Venkateshvara while it spends millions over renovation of temples located elsewhere. As a result, the Vakula Devi temple remained in dilapidated condition and in dire need of renovation.

=== Illegal mining ===
Activists and the local people of Tirupati reveal that it is politics, corruption, the careless attitude of those in power that has resulted in poor maintenance of the temple. The hillock on which the temple is situated known for best rock quality, being mined illegally to be used in construction industry.

In the meanwhile, illegal quarrying started slowly stripping away the hill from all sides. It is known that as much as 80 percent of the hill was flattened. It is known that the temple will collapse if the foundation becomes more weaker when more illegal mining happens.

Members of the archaeology group too have expressed concern over this poor attitude towards preserving the centuries-old temple. "No official is bothered to preserve this ancient heritage structure. We cannot allow the temple to fall in the hands of land sharks," an archaeologist associated with Tirumala temple affairs said.

=== Public outrage and protests ===
A number of organizations, Hindu religious heads and leaders of various political parties expressed anguish over the pathetic condition of the temple, and have approached TTD over the years to restore the Vakula Devi Temple.

Many Hindu saints and seers have also made representations to the government regarding the need to renovate the temple and ban the illegal mining in the area. Svami Paripurnananda Sarasvati of Sripitam, as well as activists from the Global Hindu Heritage Foundation performed a Padayatra to Peruru Banda hillock and protested against the inaction of TTD and the government of the day. Svami Paripurnananda Sarasvati threatened to practice fasting at the site if TTD did not respond in time.

The Bharatiya Janata Party has protested several times in the past and submitted a memorandum to TTD Chairman and the entire organization for the cause of renovation of the temple. The party even issued a legal notice requesting the Telangana High Court to intervene, and direct TTD for renovation of the temple.

In response to the demands of various organizations, TTD responded with a plan to renovate Vakula Mata Temple with an outlay of Rs. 2 crore including Rs. 15 lakh to be spent on fencing the premises on the hillock. However, local mining companies approached the Telangana High Court and got a stay order in 2010 preventing TTD from taking up renovation of the Temple.

However, subsequently in the year 2012, the Telangana High Court vacated the stay and ordered the TTD to renovate and restore the temple. The TTD assured the Court it would comply with the order, but so far not a brick has been laid at the temple site, thereby allowing illegal mining to thrive.

=== Renovation and reconstruction ===
The Tirumala Tirupati Devasthanams (TTD) started its renovation process on the Vakula Devi Temple on 1 January 2011 and continued on it for 11 years, fully renovating and reconstructing in 2022, and it was inaugurated on 23 July 2022.

== See also ==
- List of goddesses
- List of Hindu temples in Tirupati
- List of temples under Tirumala Tirupati Devasthanams
- Venkateshvara Temple, Tirumala
