= Matrusri Tarigonda Vengamamba Annaprasada Complex =

Matrusri Tharigonda Vengamamba Annaprasadam Complex
- మాతృశ్రీ తరిగొండ వెంగమాంబ అన్నప్రసాదం కాంప్లెక్స్
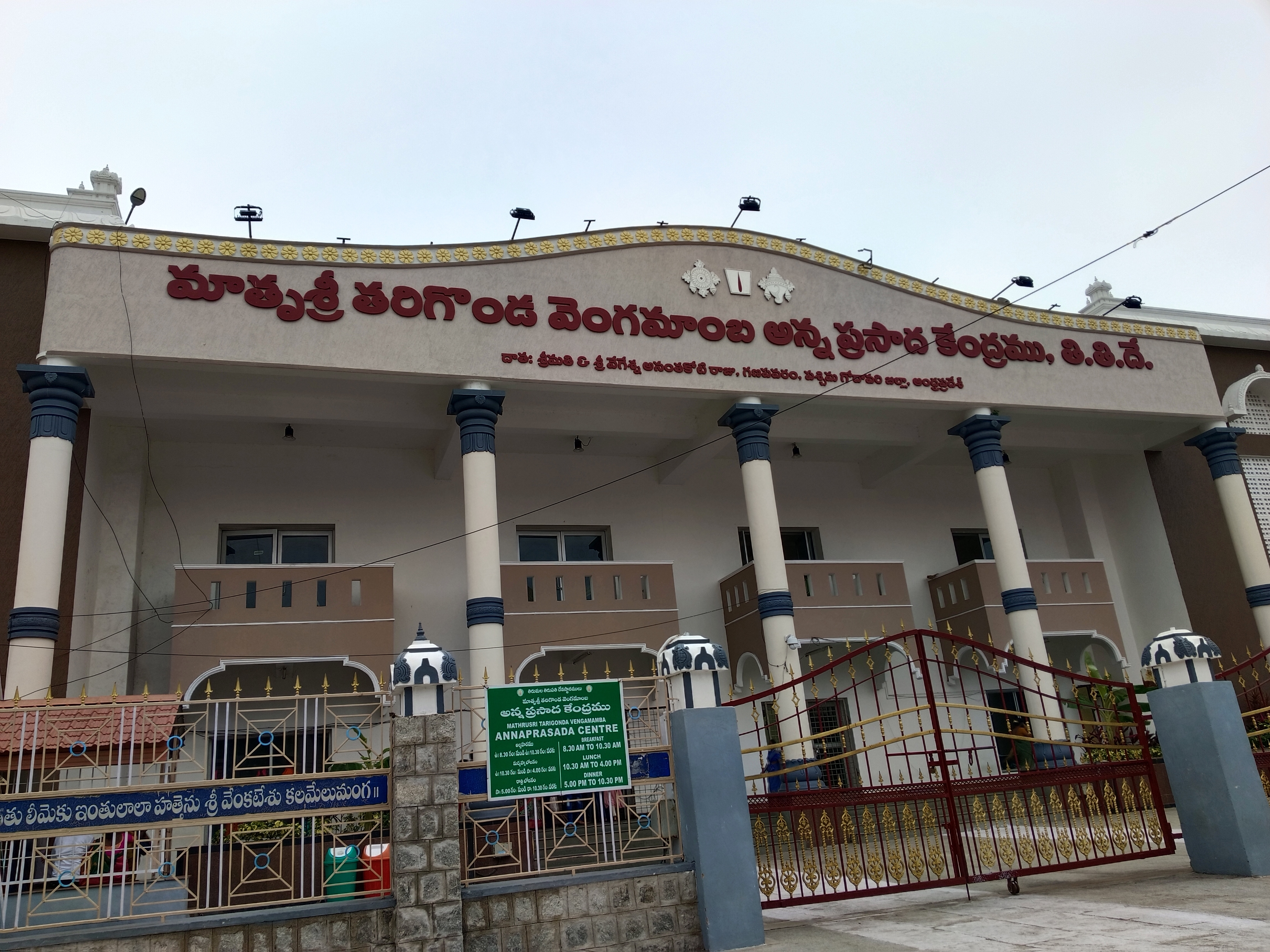

General information
- Location: Tirumala, Andhra Pradesh, India
- Coordinates: 13.6858°N 79.3492°E
- Inaugurated: July 7th ,2011
- Cost: 30 Crores (2011)
- Owner: Tirumala Tirupati Devasthanams (TTD)

Other information
- Seating capacity: 4000

Matrusri Tharigonda Vengamamba Annaprasadam Complex (MTVAC) is a large-scale free meal service facility in Tirumala, Andhra Pradesh, India. It is administered by the Tirumala Tirupati Devasthanams (TTD) and was established in 2011 to serve free meals (annaprasadam) to pilgrims visiting the Sri Venkateswara Temple. The complex was inaugurated on 7 July 2011 by the then President of India, Pratibha Patil.

The facility is named after Tarigonda Vengamamba, an eighteenth-century Telugu saint and poet, on whose historically significant ground the complex was built.

== Background ==
Tirumala, located atop the Tirumala Hills in the Tirupati district of Andhra Pradesh, is one of the most visited pilgrimage destinations in the world. The Tirumala Tirupati Devasthanams, the trust body that manages the Sri Venkateswara Temple, has maintained a long tradition of offering free meals to visiting pilgrims as part of its charitable activities — a practice rooted in the Hindu concept of annadanam (the gift of food).

As the volume of daily pilgrims at Tirumala grew considerably over the years, TTD recognised that the existing meal-service infrastructure was insufficient to meet demand without making pilgrims wait for extended periods. To address this, TTD undertook the construction of a dedicated, high-capacity facility equipped with modern food-service infrastructure. The project was completed at a cost of ₹33 crore.

== Naming and historical significance ==
The site on which MTVAC stands was once occupied by the modest thatched hut of Tarigonda Vengamamba (c. 1730–1817), a celebrated Telugu Vaishnavite poet and saint who spent many years at Tirumala in devoted worship of Lord Venkateswara. She authored several devotional works and is held in deep reverence by pilgrims and the local community alike.

TTD named the complex Mathrusri Tharigonda Vengamamba Annaprasadam Complex in her memory — Mathrusri loosely translating to "revered mother" in Telugu. The naming was intended as a tribute to Vengamamba, whose own life was one of devotion and service at the very ground the complex now occupies.

== Infrastructure and facilities ==
MTVAC consists of four large dining halls, each with a seating capacity of 1,000 pilgrims, bringing the total simultaneous seating capacity to 4,000. The complex was designed with the aim of achieving zero waiting time for pilgrims — a significant operational goal given that Tirumala receives tens of thousands of visitors on peak days and during festival seasons.

=== Storage and food preparation ===
The facility includes dedicated cold storage rooms for vegetables and perishable produce, as well as separate dry-storage spaces for groceries and other non-perishable supplies. These provisions allow for uninterrupted, large-scale food preparation while maintaining hygiene standards.

== Operations ==
MTVAC is operated directly by the Tirumala Tirupati Devasthanams as part of the trust's broader annadanam programme. Meals are served free of charge to all pilgrims, without distinction of caste, religion, or economic background. The facility is one of the largest free meal operations associated with a Hindu temple in India.

== See also ==
- Tarigonda Vengamamba
- Tirumala Tirupati Devasthanams
- Sri Venkateswara Temple, Tirumala
- Tirumala
