= Kodandarama Temple, Tirupati =

Hindu temple in India

Sri Kodanda ramaswamy Temple శ్రీ కోదండ రామస్వామి ఆలయం
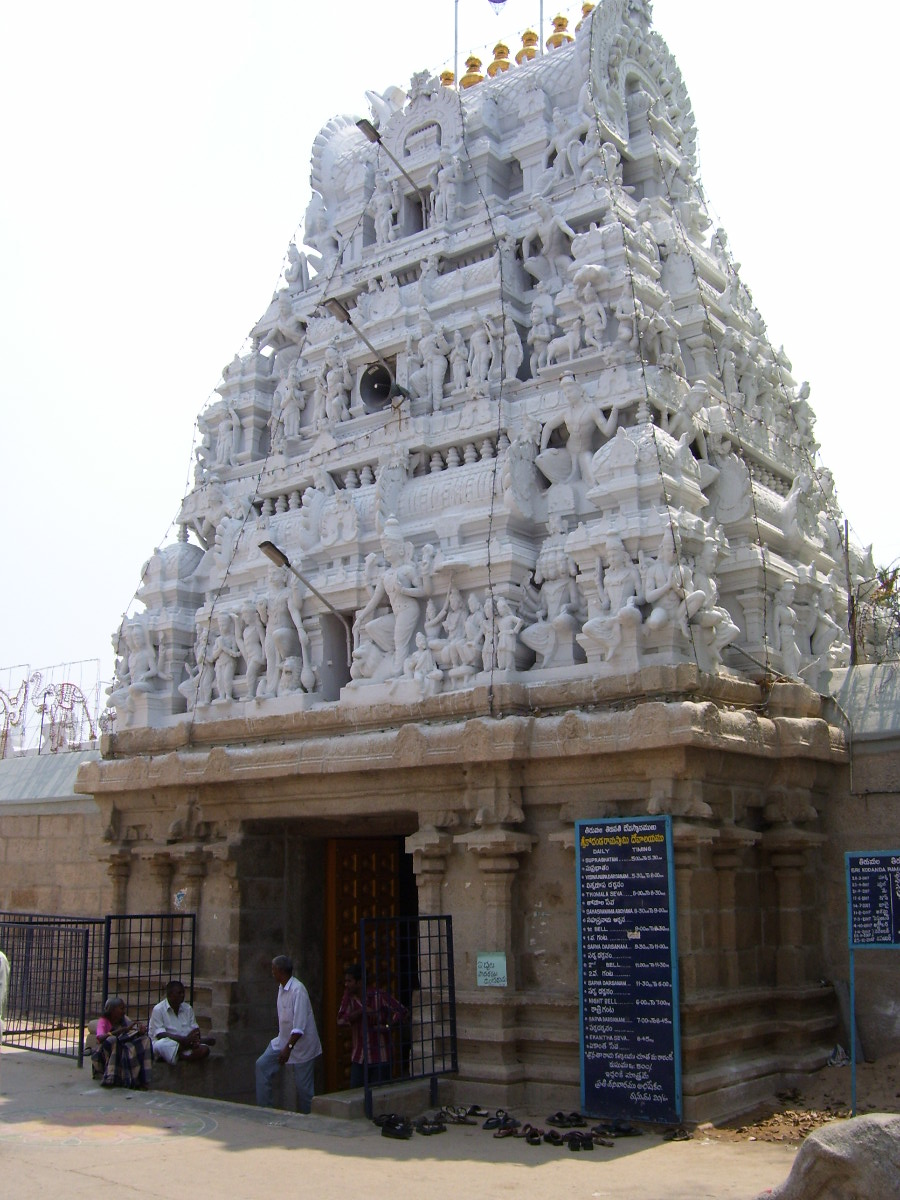

- Location in Andhra Pradesh

Religion
- Affiliation: Hinduism
- District: Tirupati
- Deity: Sri Kodandarama, Sita
- Festivals: Sri Rama Navami, Brahmotsavams
- Governing body: Tirumala Tirupati Devasthanams
- Features: Temple tank: Sri Ramachandra Pushkarini

Location
- Location: Tirupati
- State: Andhra Pradesh
- Country: India
- Interactive map of Sri Kodanda ramaswamy Temple శ్రీ కోదండ రామస్వామి ఆలయం
- Coordinates: 13°40′59.7″N 79°20′49.9″E

Architecture
- Type: Dravidian architecture
- Completed: 10th Century

Specifications
- Direction of façade: Standing and Facing west
- Temple: 2

Website
- tirumala.org

Sri Kodandaramaswamy Temple is a well known temple in the city of Tirupati located in Tirupati district of Andhra Pradesh, India. The temple is dedicated to Hindu deity Rama, an incarnation of Vishnu along with Sita and Lakshmana. The temple also has a sub-shrine for Rama's mount Anjaneya.

== History ==
=== Legend ===
According to Varaha Purana, during Treta Yuga, Lord Sri Rama resided here along with Sita Devi and Lakshmana on his return from Lankapuri.

=== Medieval History ===
It was built by a Cholas during the tenth century AD.

== Administration ==
The present day temple is organised by Tirumala Tirupati Devasthanams board.

== Festivals ==
Rama Navami is celebrated with major grandeur at this temple which includes Hanumantha Vahana Seva in connection with Sri Rama Navami day, followed by Sri Sita Rama Kalyanam on Dasami and Sri Rama Pattabhisheka Mahotsavam on Ekadasi. The nine-day annual brahmotsavams celebrated every year which falls between March and April is another biggest event in the temple. The Annual three-day Teppotsavams(Float festival) will be celebrated during April at the temple where the processional deity of Sri Rama along with Sita and Lakshmana will taken over a float in Sri Ramachandra Pushkarini.

== See also ==
- Hindu Temples in Tirupati
- List of temples under Tirumala Tirupati Devasthanams

== Reference lists ==
- TTD Seva Online
