= Kalyana Venkateswara Temple, Srinivasamangapuram =

Hindu temple in India

Kalyana Venkateswara Temple
- Sri Kalyana Venkateswara Swamy vaari Alayam
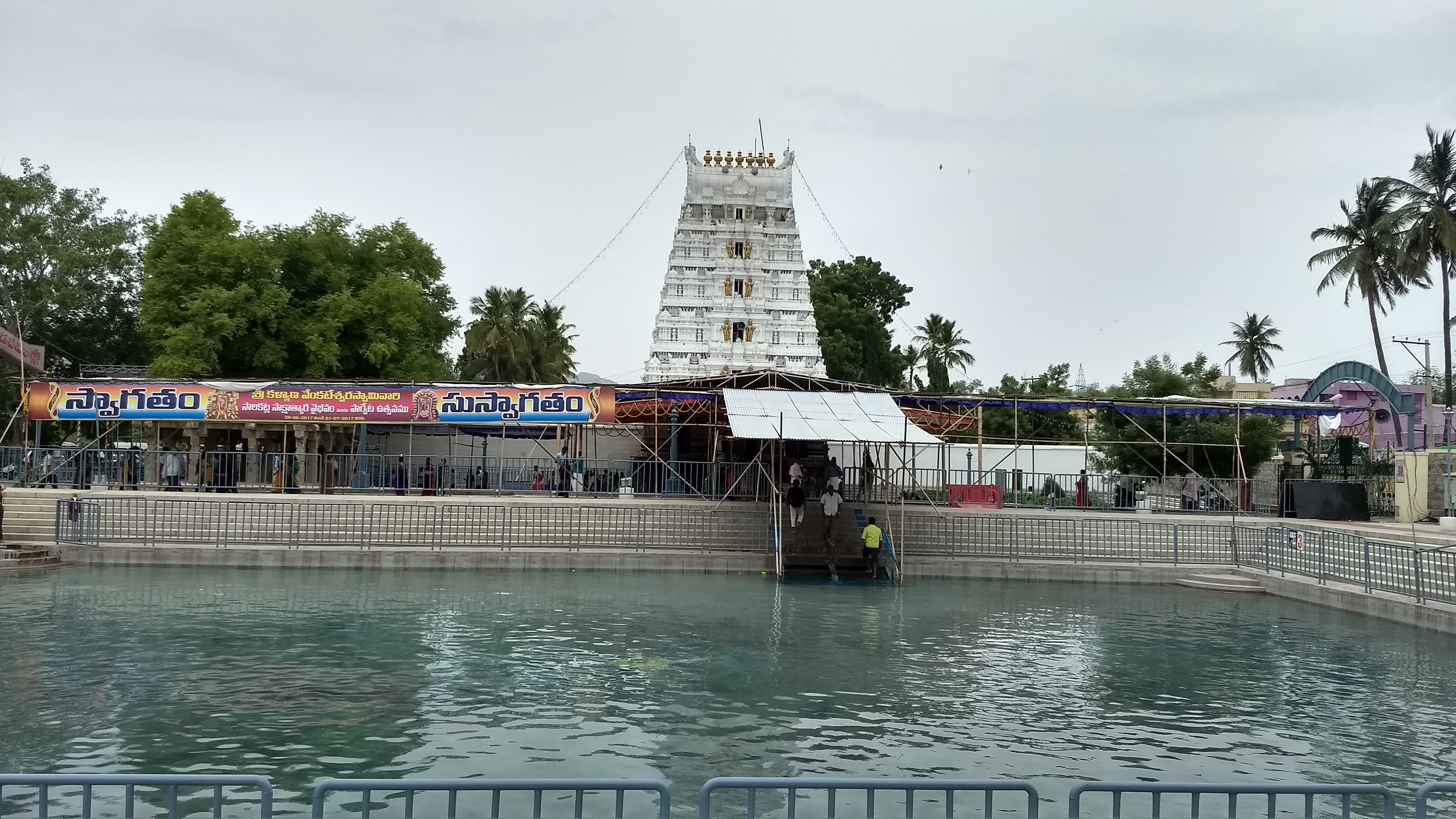

- Location in Andhra Pradesh

Religion
- Affiliation: Hinduism
- District: Tirupati
- Deity: Venkateswara
- Festivals: Brahmotsavams, Vaikuntha Ekadasi
- Governing body: Tirumala Tirupati Devasthanams

Location
- Location: Tirupati
- State: Andhra Pradesh
- Country: India
- Interactive map of Kalyana Venkateswara Temple
- Coordinates: 13°36′38.8″N 79°19′39.8″E

Architecture
- Type: Dravidian architecture

Specifications
- Temple: 2
- Monument: 1

Website
- tirumala.org

Kalyana Venkateswara Temple is an ancient Hindu temple at Srinivasamangapuram in Tirupati. It is located in Tirupati District of Andhra Pradesh, India. The temple is dedicated to the god Venkateswara, a form of Vishnu and is referred to as Kalyana Venkateswara. The temple is one of the centrally protected monuments of national importance.

The Kalyana Venkateswara Temple which is under the control of Archaeological Survey of India (ASI) is maintained by Tirumala Tirupati Devasthanams since 1967 and utsavams and rituals in this temple are being performed since 1981.

Today, Kalyana Venkateswara Temple is considered sacred by Hindus, next to Tirumala temple. Those who are unable to make it to Tirumala can have darshan of Kalyana Venkateswara to fulfill their wish. As the name indicates, this temple carries significance for newlywed couples. Newlyweds offer prayers first in this temple as this is the place where Venkateswara with his consort Padmavathi stayed for the first six months of their marriage.

== Administration ==
The temple was under the control of the ASI from 1967 to 1981. In 1981 the temple was handed over to Tirumala Tirupati Devasthanams. At present the temple is being administered by Tirumala Tirupati Devasthanams (TTD).

== Deities in the temple ==
The presiding deity of the temple is Venkateswara (a form of the god Vishnu) who is referred to as Kalyana Venkateswara. The deity faces East and is in standing posture with four hands: one right hand in varada mudra and the other holding Chakra and one left hand in kati mudra and the other holding Shankha.

The temple also hosts the deities of Lakshmi Narayana and Ranganatha, both forms of Vishnu.

== Significance ==
The temple is considered to be sacred next to Venkateswara Temple in Tirumala, which is the chief of the deity. The temple is recognised as Ancient monument of National importance by Archaeological survey of India.

== See also ==
- Hindu Temples in Tirupati
- List of temples under Tirumala Tirupati Devasthanams
- List of Monuments of National Importance in Andhra Pradesh
- Venkateswara Temple, Tirumala
