= Vaikuntam Queue Complex =

Queue management facility in India

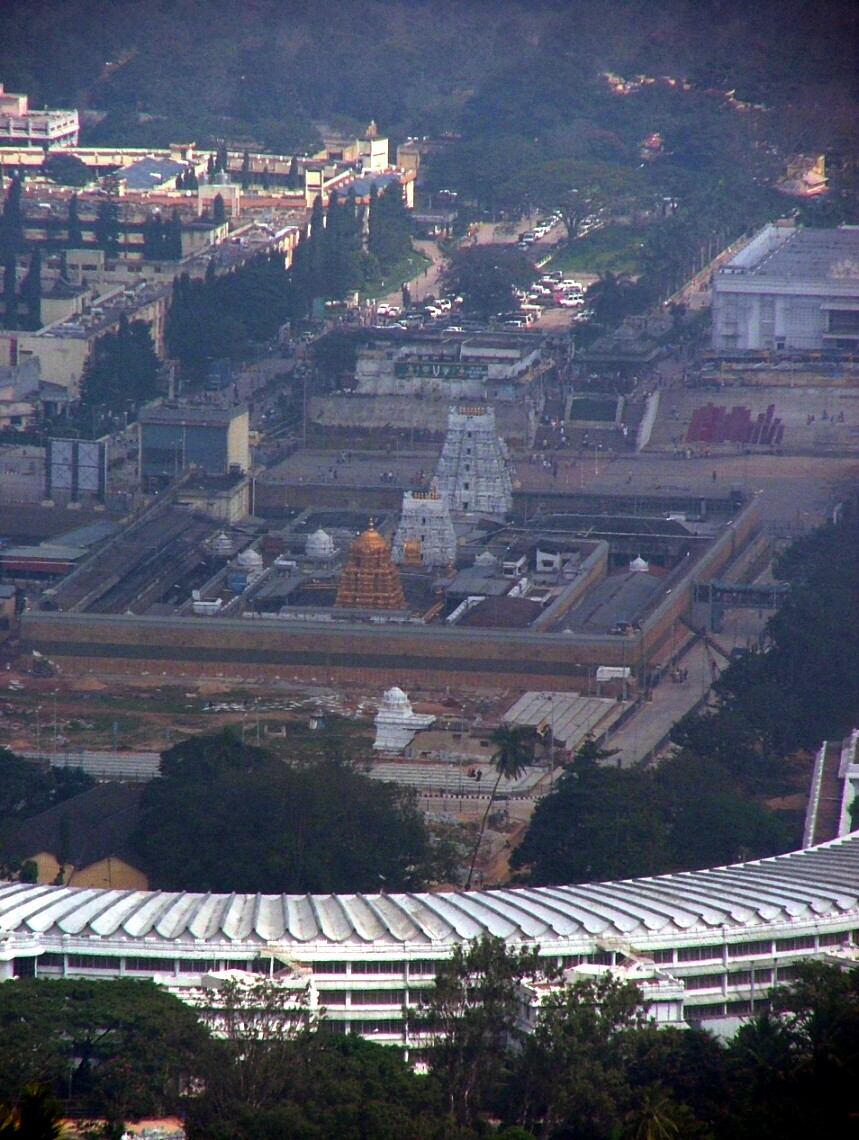
Tirumala Venkateswara Temple with the Vaikuntham Queue Complex in the foreground recognizable as the semicircular building

Vaikuntham Queue Complex is a facility used in Tirumala Venkateswara Temple, Tirumala by Tirumala Tirupati Devasthanams (TTD) for queue management. The complex serves as the entry point for all darshans and there are very few exceptions.Currently there are two Vaikuntham Queue Complex in Tirumala.

== History ==
The mid-1970s saw a sudden spike in the pilgrim inflow to the temple with rapid improvements in access to Tirupati and Tirumala. TTD added hundreds of cottages on the hills in Tirumala but could not address the crowd management fully. With the lack of infrastructure to hold pilgrims, the temple witnessed serpentine queues outside the temple and during peak season circling the 4 mada streets. TTD under the leadership of Sri P.V.R.K. Prasad (Executive Officer) and B.Nagi Reddy (chairman, Board of Trustees) planned for a queue complex system that could hold 14,000 people as a solution for crowd management. Work began in 1980 and was completed in 1983. The then Chief Minister N. T. Rama Rao inaugurated the facility in 1983.

Modifications were made to the queue complex by additional rooms on the north western side of the temple in 1985 but those have been removed and replaced by a second queue complex in 2000 that is located down the road from the first queue complex.

At present, Queue complex-1 (old) caters to all Arjita Seva, Special Darshan (Paid Darshan), Cellar Ticket ticket holders. Pilgrims opting for Sarvadarshan (free entrance) are sent through Queue complex-2 (new).

== Queue Complex ==
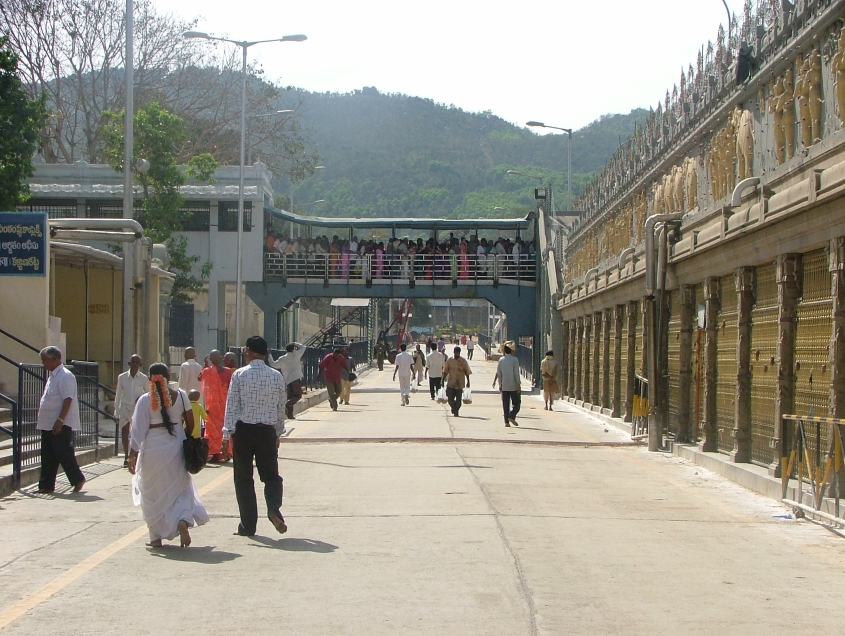
Bridge connecting Queue complex to Temple. Temple is on the right side of the photo and the steps to reach the Queue complex (not seen here) is seen at the front left side of the photo

The Vaikuntham Queue complex is a semicircular building and opens into a garden maintained by TTD. The complex is situated on the southwest corner of the temple and is separated from the temple by the South Mada Street. The building has three levels in total and there are 19 halls in each level. Each hall has two doors - one for allowing pilgrims into the hall and the other for pilgrims to exit the hall and enter the corridor leading to the temple. The corridors connect to the southeast end of the temple by an overhead bridge. After the descent, the pilgrims turn around the corner and enter the temple through the main gopuram. To ensure pilgrims entering the temple for various activities are allowed at the same time, there are 2 queues and attendants inside the gopuram route the pilgrims appropriately.

== Features ==
=== Basic Facilities ===
Inside the holding areas and rooms, TTD provides free food, fresh milk as well as medical aid facilities. Sanitary needs are also taken care of. Each compartment is provided with LED TV telecasting Sri Venkateswara Bhakti Channel(SVBC), a TTD-owned Devotional channel.

=== Security ===
The entrance to the Vaikuntham Queue complex is staffed by Police, security and temple officials. For Arjita Seva ticket holders, the tickets are checked manually before allowing pilgrims inside the complex. Various sign boards indicate the location of the room where pilgrims need to report for their darshan or seva. Outside the room, the ticket is checked along with the fingerprints and (as necessary) face matches with the biometric data provided at the time of ticket purchase. Just before entering the temple, there is a baggage scanner to check bags carried inside the temple. Pilgrims are asked to exit the queue complex and deposit mobile phones and cameras, if present - a scenario that could delay darshan. Inside the queue complex as well as in the temple (leading right to the sanctum sanctorum), TTD has installed security cameras to oversee pilgrims' movements.
