= Sri Venkateswara Ramnarain Ruia Government General Hospital =

- Government of Andhra Pradesh

Geography
- Location: Tirupati, Andhra Pradesh, India
- Coordinates: 13.644965°N 79.405757°E

Organisation
- Affiliated university: Sri Venkateswara Medical College

Services
- Emergency department: yes
- Beds: 1500

History
- Founded: 1962

Links
- Lists: Hospitals in India

Sri Venkateswara Ramnarain Ruia Government General Hospital (also Ruia Hospital) is a hospital in the pilgrim city of Tirupati, Andhra Pradesh, India. It is the largest public hospital in Rayalaseema region of Andhra Pradesh. It had 1500 beds, 27 operation theatres, 25 ICUs, and 10 specialties. It serves majorly four districts of Rayalaseema(Chittoor, Kadapa), Nellore and districts of Andhra Pradesh. It is started in the year 1962 with a donation of Rs.5 lakhs from Sri Radha Krishna N. Ruia and 15 lakhs from Tirumala Tirupati Devasthanams.
