= Sapthagiri (magazine) =

- Chief editor: Dr. V. G. Chokkalingam
- Honorary Editor: Muddada Ravichandra,IAS
- Photographer: P.N. Shekar, B.Venkataramana
- Publisher: Tirumala Tirupati Devasthanam
- Founded: 1949
- Country: India
- Language: Sanskrit; Telugu; Tamil; Kannada; Hindi; English

Sapthagiri magazine is an illustrated devotional magazine published by Tirumala Tirupati Devasthanams. It was started as a bulletin in 1949. It is printed monthly, in six languages - Sanskrit, Telugu, Tamil, Kannada, Hindi and English.

The objective of the magazine is to propagate religious thoughts, nurture spiritual ideals and develop Bhakti and positive thinking among the people. Sapthagiri contains articles on Hindu philosophy and culture. It also has features like Questions and Answers.

This magazine also has an online subscription. The old issues of this magazine are made available online.

== Contents ==
The magazine publishes series on Mahabharata and Tirumala temple history. There are some personal experiences by the devotees and short moral stories from the puranas to children. It also features some details about the various programs of TTD.
