= Pottipadu =

Village in India

- Village
- Location in Andhra Pradesh, India
- Coordinates: 14°51′52″N 78°21′57″E
- Country: India
- State: Andhra Pradesh
- District: YSR Kadapa
- Mandal: Kondapuram
- Established: 1950 s

Languages
  - Official: Telugu
- Time zone: UTC+5:30 (IST)
- PIN: 516474

Pottipadu is a village in Kondapuram mandal, YSR Kadapa district of Andhra Pradesh State, India, lies 97 KM west of Kadapa, the district headquarters. The state’s capital, Vijayawada, is 436 KM away. The postal code of Pottipadu is 516464 and its post office is in Lavanur.

Pottipadu is near the borders of Kondapuram, Tadipatri, Mylavaram, Putlur and Simhadripuram mandals.

Some of the nearby cities are Tadpatri, Jammalamadugu, Proddatur and Yerraguntla.

Pottipadu is also close to the boundary between Cuddapah District and Anantapur District. Yellanur in Anantapur District is south of Pottipadu.

== Population ==
| Census Parameter | Census Data (2011) |
|---|---|
| Total Population | 792 |
| Total No of Houses | 229 |
| Female Population % | 49.9 % ( 395) |
| Total Literacy rate % | 53.0 % ( 420) |
| Female Literacy rate | 21.5 % ( 170) |
| Scheduled Tribes Population % | 0.0 % ( 0) |
| Scheduled Caste Population % | 23.5 % ( 186) |
| Working Population % | 63.5 % |
| Child(0 -6) Population by 2011 | 64 |
| Girl Child(0 -6) Population % by 2011 | 46.9 % ( 30) |

== Notable people ==
1. Nagi Reddi - Indian film producer and director mainly in Telugu cinema. He set up Vijaya Vauhini Studios in Chennai, which was then Asia's biggest film studio.
