= Government Maternity Hospital, Tirupati =

- Government of Andhra Pradesh; Tirumala Tirupati Devasthanams

Geography
- Location: Tirupati, Andhra Pradesh, India

Services
- Emergency department: yes
- Beds: 152

History
- Founded: 1962

Government Maternity Hospital is a Maternity hospital in the pilgrim city of Tirupati, Andhra Pradesh, India. It is the largest maternity hospital in Andhra Pradesh. In 2013, it had 152 beds with minimum 50 deliveries being carried out per day. It serves majorly four districts of Rayalaseema (Chittoor, Kadapa, Kurnool, Anantapur), Nellore and Prakasam districts of Andhra Pradesh and few areas of Tamil Nadu. It was established in 1962.
