= Tarigonda Vengamamba =

Indian Telugu poet (1730–1817)

- Tharigonda Vengamamba
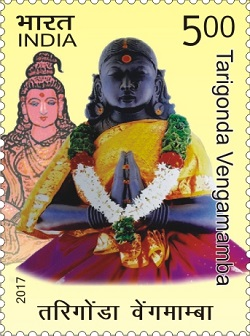
- Born: 20 April 1730; Tarikonda village, Andhra Pradesh
- Died: 21 August 1817 (aged 87); Tirumala
- Spouse: Lord Venkateswara
- Writing career
- Language: Telugu
- Period: 18th Century
- Genres: Poet, Yogini
- Notable works: Vishnu Parijatham, Chenchu Natakam, Rukmini Natakam and Jala Krida Vilasam and Mukthi Kanthi Vilasam (all Yaksha Ganams), Gopi Natakam (Golla Kalapam-Yakshaganam), Rama Parinayam, Sri Bhagavatham, Sri Krishna Manjari, Tatva Keerthanalu and Vashista Ramayanam (Dwipada), Sri Venkataachala Mahatyam (Padya Prabhandam) and Ashtanga Yoga, Saram (Padyakruthi).

Tarigonda Vengamamba (alternate spelling: Venkamamba; 20 April 1730 – 21 August 1817), also known as Matrusri Tarigonda Vengamamba, was a poet and staunch devotee of God Venkateswara in the 18th century. She wrote numerous poems and songs.

== Early years ==
Vengamamba was born into a family of Vangipuram (Vengipuram) in a brahmin family in 1730 in the Tarigonda village of Andhra Pradesh state. Her father was Krishnayamatya and mother was Mangamamba. Since childhood, she was an ardent devotee of Lord Venkateswara, and her devotion made the villagers believe that she was insane.

Married at a very early age (common practice in those times), she lost her husband Injeti Venkatachalapathi and became a child-widow. However, she refused to accept anyone but the Lord as her husband and continued to dress as a married woman (such as wearing mangalsutra, non-white clothing, bottu/bindi).

She studied yoga sciences under Acharya (professor) Subrahmnayudu and became a yogini. As a result, she faced resentment of the local priest in Tarigonda, and shifted to Tirumala. She was welcomed by the priest and descendants of Annamayya, all who had heard of her devotion prior to her move.

== Vengamamba's Harathi ==
Moved by her devotion, it is told that God Venkateswara allowed her to enter the temple after temple hours to hear her poems and songs. Venkamamba recited poems and took 'harati' of the Lord each night and paid pearls as fee to the Lord. Observing pearls in the sanctum sanctorum over a period of time, the priests' investigation led to Venkamamba. Their punishment was to exile her to a cave in Tumburakona, a distance of 15 miles from Tirumala.

The legend goes on that Venkateswara Swamy created a secret passage from the cave to the temple, which was used by Venkamamba to continue her devotional service. The practice of penance and night harati continued for 6 years. Eventually, the priests realized their folly and recognized Venkamamba's devotion and dedication, and requested her to return. Upon return, she was allowed to participate in Ekanta seva and take the final harati of the Lord.

The area around her brindavan (samādhi) was later converted into a school (S.V.B.N.R high school tirumala), with the brindavan still open for pilgrims' worship in the school playground.

The Nityannadana Satram in Tirumala is named on Matrusri Tarigonda Vengamamba.

== Literary works ==
Her first poem was Tarigonda Nrusimha Satakam and it was followed by Nrusimha Vilasa Katha, Siva Natakam and Balakrishna Natakam as Yakshaganam and Rajayogamrutha Saram, a Dwipada Kavyam. These works were completed when she was in Tarikonda.

On her return to Tirumala from Tumburakona caves, Vengamamba composed Vishnu Parijatham, Chenchu Natakam, Rukmini Natakam and Jala Krida Vilasam and Mukthi Kanthi Vilasam (all Yaksha Ganams), Gopi Natakam (Golla Kalapam-Yakshaganam), Rama Parinayam, Sri Bhagavatham, Sri Krishna Manjari, Tatva Keerthanalu and Vashista Ramayanam (Dwipada), Sri Venkataachala Mahatyam (Padya Prabhandam) and Ashtanga Yoga, Saram (Padyakruthi).

== Ekanta Seva ==
Since the Lord accepted Venkamamba's devotion, her harati has been incorporated into Ekanta Seva performed to the Lord each night. A descendant of Venkamamba pays pearls as fee, and the harati is called Venkamamba's harati.

== Movies based on life of Vengamamba ==
The Movie Vengamamba is released in 2009 by Duraiswamy Raju and has Meena playing the lead, portraying Vengamamba. M. M. Keeravani rendered tunes to Vengamamba Krutis and placed them in movie. Complete Vengamamba Harati was included in the Audio.

TTD's Sri Venkateswara Bhakti Channel is telecasting a tele serial named "Tarigonda Venkamamba", on the life and times of Venkamamba. The serial is produced by Duraiswamy Raju and has Meena playing the lead, portraying Venkamamba. The tele serial has been received excellent response, and stands next to Siva Narayana Teerthulu, which has K. Viswanath playing the lead and K. Raghavendra Rao's Shrushti, which are also being telecasted on TTD's Sri Venkateswara Bhakti Channel.
