= Tirupati Ganga Jatara =

Annual folk festival in India

- Observed by: Hindus in Tirupati district and surrounding areas
- Type: Hindu, cultural
- Celebrations: Veshas, Animal sacrifices, offering Pongal, Ambali, Sarees, Sapparalu
- Begins: First Tuesday of Vaisaka masam
- Ends: Second Tuesday of Vaisaka masam
- Date: Varies per Hindu Lunisolar calendar

Tirupati Ganga Jatara
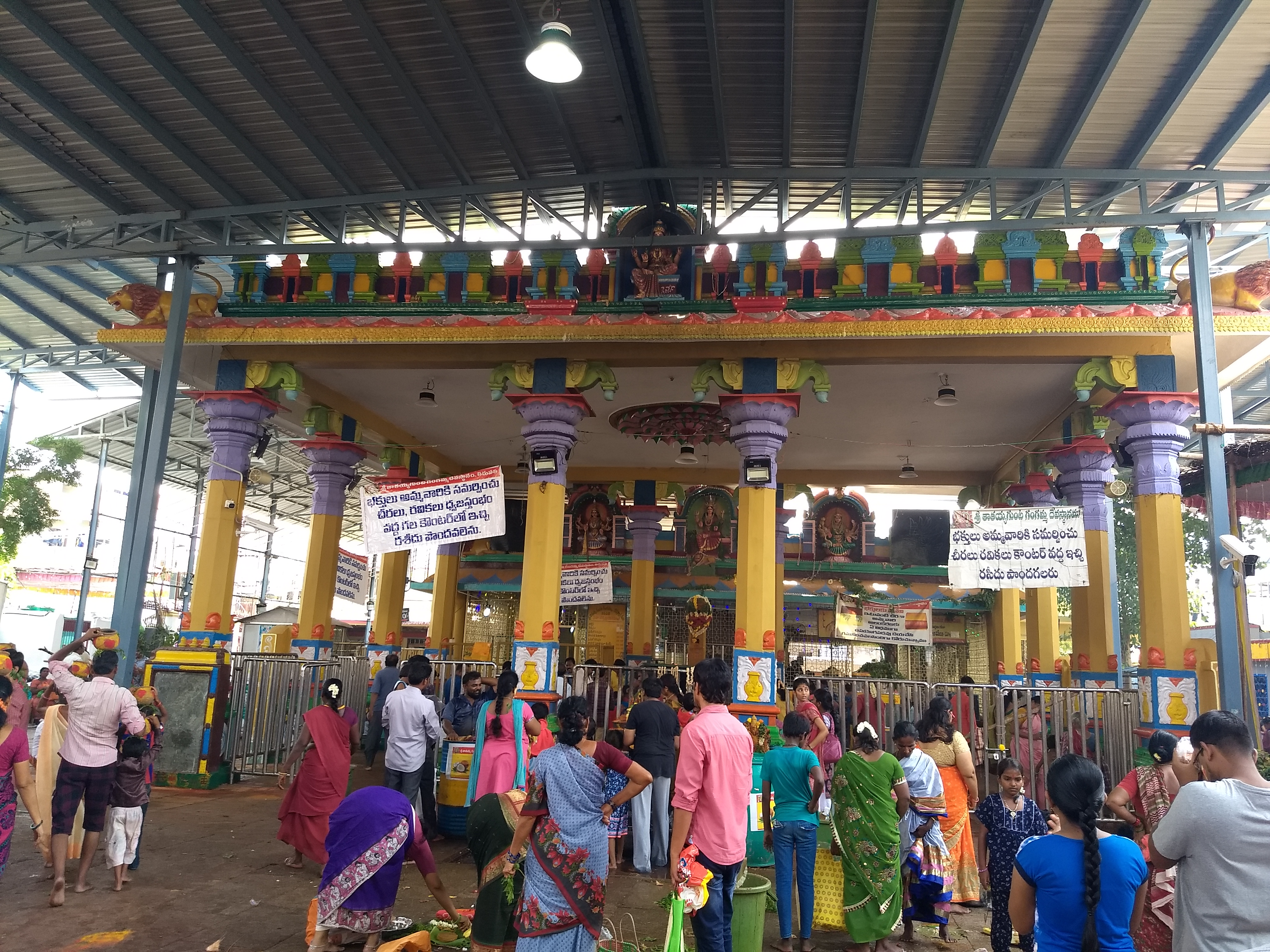
- Tirupati gangamma Temple during fifth day of annual Tirupati gangamma jatara

Religion
- Affiliation: Hinduism
- District: Tirupati
- Deity: Gangamma

Location
- Location: TATA Nagar,Tirupati
- State: Andhra Pradesh
- Country: India
- Interactive map of Tirupati Ganga Jatara
- Coordinates: 13.65°N 79.42°E

Tirupati Gangamma Jatara is the annual folk festival of Tirupati, India. It is a week long event which falls between the first and second weeks of May every year. This festival is to offer prayers to the Goddess Gangamma, the Gramadevata (the goddess protecting the region) of Tirupati. The Goddess Gangamma is considered the sister of God Venkateshwara Balaji, the presiding deity of the Venkateshwara Temple, located in Tirupati, Andhra Pradesh.

This folk festival is celebrated grandly at the Tirupati city famous temple of Goddess Gangamma (sister of lord Venkateshwara) called Tataiahgunta Gangamma Temple located on the east side of Tirupati city.

== Legend ==
Sri Tataiahgunta Gangamma is Grama Devatha of Tirupati city. Once upon a time when Tirupati and surrounding areas were ruled by Palegondulu, harassment of women was enormous – they used to rape and harass any woman seen. During this time, in a village "Avilala", the Goddess Gangamma was born and grew into a beautiful woman. When the Palegondulu wanted to harm Goddess Gangamma, she with her grace and power was about to kill him. Palegondulu, fearing her, hid in a remote place.

To take him out of hiding, the Gangamma planned "Ganga Jathara" where the people in Tirupathi do vichitra veshadarana and curse Gangamma for a period of 7 days. On the seventh day, the Palegondulu comes out of hiding and was killed by Goddess Gangamma for the LokaKalyanam (well being of all people).

== About ==
Ganga Jatara, the folk festival of Tirupati, begins with the formal Chatimpu (announcement) around midnight of Tuesday. The Gangamma Jatara is held by the viswakarma Mirasi Achari family – Eepuri Devarjuluachari and Kasi shankara Achari take charge of Jatara festival and make all arrangements.

The Gangamma Jatara is a very famous local festival for the people of Tirupati. It is done every year in May. As the Gangamma temple was in the banks of Thathaya gunta, the temple is famously known as "Tataiahgunta Gangamma Temple".

Priests performed the initiatory rituals and tied `Vadibalu' to the `Viswaroopa Sthambam' in front of the temple, that set the stage for the fete. Men making the Chatimpu roam through the old town beating dappus to announce that the festival has begun and hence the residents should not leave the town till the festival is over.

Priests make the traditional huge clay idol of the goddess at the temple's portico. Everyone during the festival comes and prays to the goddess to offer her pongal, sarees, turmeric and kumkum, etc.

During the last day of festival, the portico will be smashed it into pieces at the auspicious moment. Devotees then clamour around to get the clay smithereens, which they consider as sacred, to be either preserved in the 'Puja' room or consumed by mixing it in water. Though there is a ban on animal sacrifice, goats and fowls were chopped at will at a corner of the temple.

This festival is being celebrated on 13, 14 and 15 May every year, in most of the areas in undivided chittoor district (like Tirupati, Chittoor and Palamaner etc.), Andhra Pradesh, India.

== The Festival ==
=== Day 0: Chatimpu ===
The Jatara (Folk Festival) officially begins with Chatimpu (official announcement) during midnight of 2nd Tuesday of the month of May. Traditionally town folk stay away from streets during Chatimpu. This announcement is carried out by playing musical instruments known as Dappu.

=== Day 1: Bhairagi Vesham ===
The day after chatimpu is Bhairagi Vesham. On this day, (Wednesday) people used to smear their body with white color paste (Namam Kommu) and wear a garland made of "Rella kaya" (fruit). They will hold neem leaves with the hand and also tie their waist with neem leaves. Devotees will walk to the temple through the city and will leave those neem leaves and Rella Kaya graland there at the temple after the darshan of the Goddess. Devotees will do such procession on each day for the rest of the festival duration.

=== Day 2: Banda Vesham ===
On this day devotees used to smear their body with kumkum color paste and ties a ribbon to the head.

=== Day 3: Thoti Vesham ===
On this day devotees used to smear their body with charcoal and wears a garland made out of neem leaves.

=== Day 4: Dora vesham ===
On this day devotees used to smear their body with sandal paste (Chandanam) and wears a garland made out of neem leaves and lemons.

=== Day 5: Mathangi Vesham ===
Gangamma who killed Palegadu in Dhora Vesham, consoled Chieftain's wife in Mathangi Vesham.

=== Day 6: Sunnapu kundalu ===
On the sixth day of the festival, the devotees anoint their body with white paste and apply dots with charcoal. And carries a pot (Veyyi kalla Dutta) on their head. Upon reaching the temple the devotees goes around the temple three times carrying the pot on their head. Leaves the pot there in the temple after the 3rd round and go for the goddess Darshan.

=== Day 7: Gangamma Jatara ===
The last day of the festival is celebrated as Ganga Jatara. During this day, all Gangamma temples in Tirupati are flocked with lakhs of devotees. People used to visit the temple and offer "pongallu" and/or Sarees to Gangamma. Few Devotees used to have darshan of Gangamma by wearing "Sapparalu" (A special gopuram like object made of bamboo) along with "Dappu Vaidyam" (A musical instrument). "Ragi Ambali" is served to the devotees visiting temples all over the city.

After midnight, a clay idol of Gangamma (Viswaroopam) is installed in front of the Temple. A guy will dress up like "Perantallu" and will remove the chempa (cheek) of viswaroopam which is referred to as "Chempa Tholagimpu". The clay is later distributed to the Devotees who are believed to have curing powers. By this event the entire seven-day Jatara will come to an end.

== Offerings ==
=== Animals ===
Devotees offer the goddess goats and hens.

=== Pongal ===
Women prepare pongal (a dish prepared with rice, mung beans and sugar) in the temple and offer it to the goddess.

=== Walking on knees ===
Similarly, there is another practice for women to come on their knees from their homes to the temple. First, they roll a coconut on the road and then walk on their knees up to the point, pick up the coconut and roll it again. These practices bear testimony to the strong faith the native residents of Tirupati have in the goddess.

=== Drinks ===
'Ragi Ambali', a drink made of ragi, curd and rice, is offered to the goddess and is then distributed to the devotees.

== In popular culture ==
In the movie Pushpa 2: The Rule hero Allu Arjun dresses in Mathangi Vesham.

== See also ==
- Hindu Temples in Tirupati
- Tirupati
- Gangamma Jatara
