= Gangamma Jatara =

Indian folk festival

Gangamma Jatara or Gangamma Jathra
- Type: Festival of Goddess
- Observances: Offering to the Goddess Ganga or Gangamma
- Duration: 8 days
- Frequency: annual

Gangamma Jatara (Telugu: గంగమ్మ జాతర, romanized: gaṁgamma jātara, lit. 'Fair of Gangamma') is a folk festival celebrated in several places across Southern India; including Andhra Pradesh and Karnataka. It is celebrated for eight days.

Fishermen also celebrate it before the start of fishing in Andhra region.

== See also ==
- Bonalu
- Tirupati Ganga Jatara
