= Padmavati Temple =

Hindu temple in Andhra Pradesh, India

Padmavati Temple, Tiruchanur
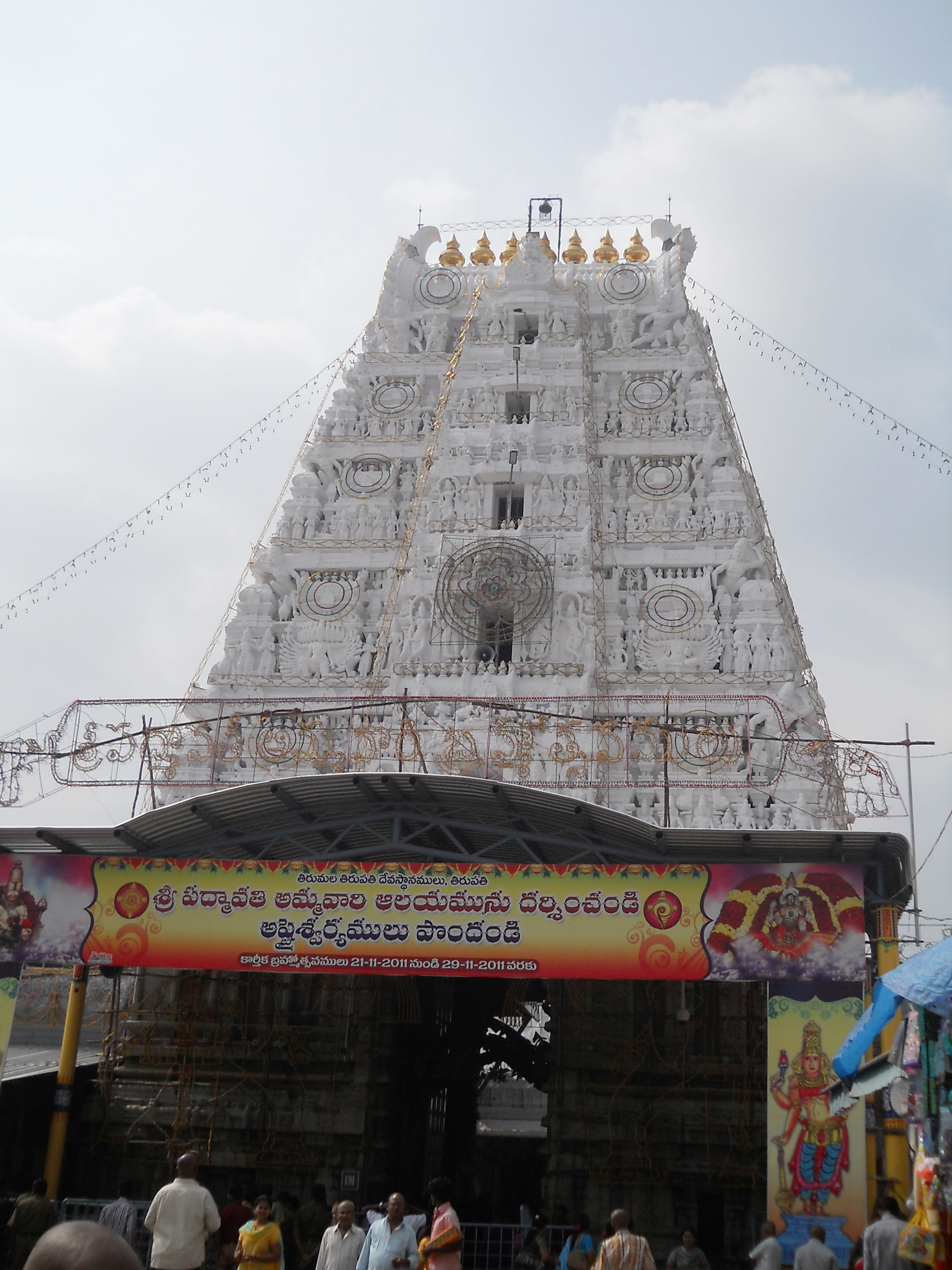
- Pradhana (Main) Gopuram of the temple, Thiruchanur

- Padmavati Temple, Tiruchanur, Tirupati, Andhra Pradesh

Religion
- Affiliation: Hinduism
- District: Tirupati
- Deity: Padmavati Ammavari
- Festivals: Brahmotsavam, Panchami Tirtham, Varalakshmi Vratam
- Governing body: Tirumala Tirupati Devasthanams

Location
- Location: Thiruchanur, Tirupati
- State: Andhra Pradesh
- Country: India
- Coordinates: 13°36′28.1″N 79°27′00.4″E

Architecture
- Type: Dravidian architecture

Specifications
- Temple: 4
- Inscriptions: Tamil, Telugu and Sanskrit
- Elevation: 157.23 m (516 ft)

Website
- tirumala.org

Padmavati Temple is a Hindu temple to the deity Padmavati (Alamelu Mangamma or Alarmel Mangai), the consort of Venkanna, in Tiruchanur, Tirupati district, Andhra Pradesh, India.

The temple is under the administration of Tirumala Tirupati Devasthanams.
