= Padmavati (Hinduism) =

Hindu goddess

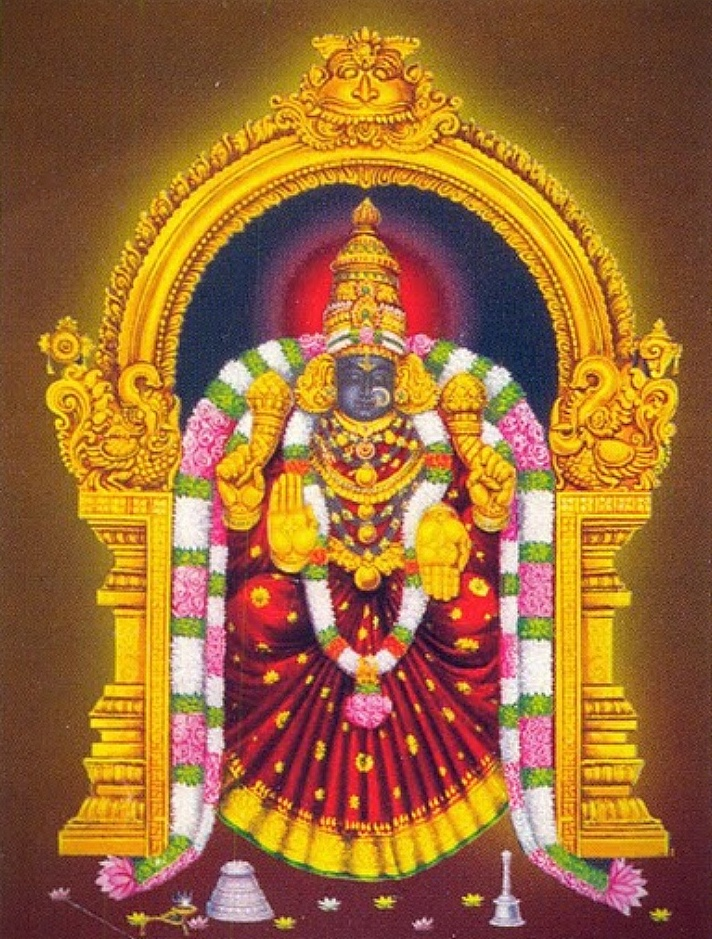
- Image of Padmavati
- Other names: Alamelu Manga; Alarmel Mangai; Tayar
- Venerated in: Sri Vaishnavism
- Affiliation: Lakshmi
- Symbol: Golden lotus
- Mount: Elephant
- Temple: Padmavati Temple, Tiruchanur
- Parents: Akasha Raja, Dharani Devi
- Consort: Venkateswara

Padmavati (Sanskrit: पद्मावती, lit. 'she of the lotus'), also known as Alamelu Manga (Telugu: అలమేలు మంగ) and Alarmel Mangai (Tamil: அலர்மேல் மங்கை) is a Hindu goddess. She is an avatar of goddess Lakshmi and the consort of Venkateswara, a form of Vishnu.

In Jainism, Padmavati is a highly revered yakshi (guardian deity) and an attendant to the 23rd Tirthankara, Parshvanatha. In this tradition, she is the goddess of prosperity and has the power to cure snakebites.

== Etymology and other names ==
Padmavati is derived from the Sanskrit terms padma lotus and vati (possessor).

The names Alamelu Manga and Alarmel Mangai are constructed from the Dravidian root words alar(u) (lotus), mel(u) (upon), and manga(i) (woman). She is popularly addressed by the honorifics Tayar in Tamil and Amma in Telugu, both meaning mother.

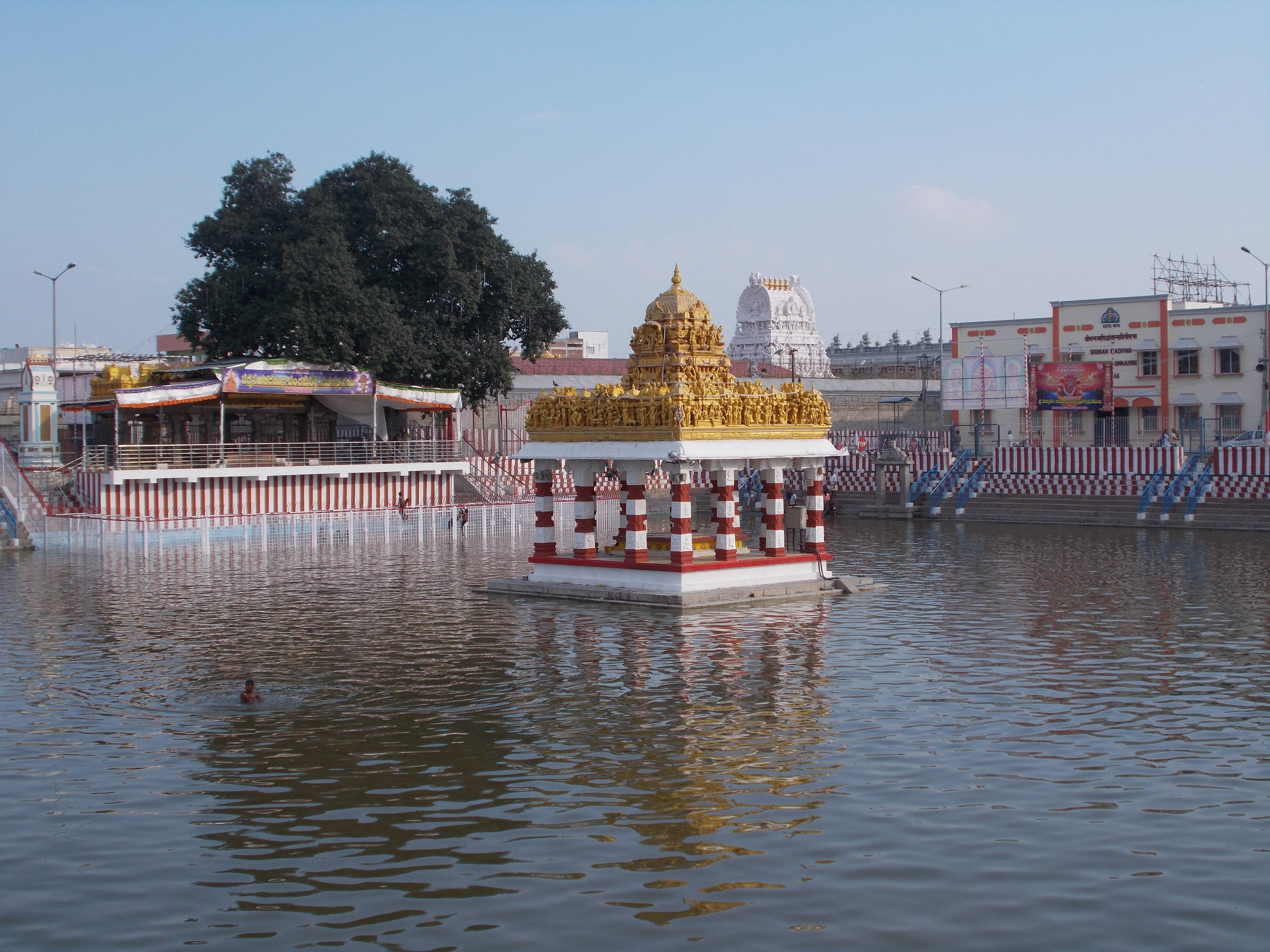
Padmasarovaram (temple tank)

== Legend ==
=== Bhrigu's curse ===
According to the legend of Tirumala, the sage Narada once observed a group of rishis (sages) performing a yajna (ritual sacrifice) who debated which deity should receive its fruits. To resolve this, the sages appointed Bhrigu to meet the Trimurti at their respective abodes. After both Brahma and Shiva failed to acknowledge Bhrigu satisfactorily upon his arrival, the sage cursed Brahma to receive no worship and decreed that Shiva would be worshipped primarily in the form of a lingam.

Finally, Bhrigu entered Vaikuntha, where Vishnu also appeared not to notice him. Insulted by the repeated disregard, Bhrigu kicked Vishnu in the chest. The deity placated the sage by apologising and massaging his feet. During this act, Vishnu crushed the extra eye located on the sole of Bhrigu's foot, which symbolised and destroyed the sage's ego. This prompted Bhrigu to seek forgiveness and select Vishnu as the recipient of the yajna.

However, Lakshmi viewed the kick as a personal insult, as she considered the chest of Vishnu her personal abode. Consequently, she departed Vaikuntha and descended to the city of Kolhapur. Vishnu followed her path to Earth, arriving at the Seshachalam forest in Tirumala, where he engaged in a twelve-year penance.

=== Birth ===
In the kingdom of Narayanavanam, the childless royal couple King Akasha Raja and Queen Dharani Devi discovered an infant girl inside a golden lotus in a pond during the performance of a ritual. Because she was found within a thousand-petaled lotus and was regarded as an incarnation of Lakshmi, she was adopted by the royal couple and named Padmavati. Padmavati was raised to be a princess, described to be of great beauty and intelligence. Meanwhile, Vishnu incarnated as Srinivasa, the foster son of an elderly woman-saint named Vakula Devi.

Padmavati is generally identified with Alamelu Manga, however, in some accounts, Padmavati and Alamelu Manga are treated as distinct deities. In this tradition, Padmavati is seen as the incarnation of Lakshmi whom took birth to marry Venkateswara, while Alamelu manga (Mahalakshmi) who left Vaikuntha decided to reside in Kolhapur while Venkateshwar stayed in Tirupati.

=== Marriage ===
While Padmavati was gathering flowers with her attendants in a garden, the sage Narada approached her and performed a palm reading to predict her future. He foretold that she was destined to become the consort of Vishnu. During this time, Srinivasa, a manifestation of Vishnu who was hunting in the surrounding hills, pursued a wild elephant into the same garden, frightening the women. Upon seeing Srinivasa, the elephant saluted him, and departed. Srinivasa enquired about the princess from her attendants and fell in love with her.

Srinivasa subsequently informed his foster mother, Vakula Devi, of his intent to marry the princess. Meanwhile, Padmavati fell ill from distress over the encounter, prompting her attendants to consult a fortune teller to foretell her future. When Srinivasa, in the guise of the fortune teller, affirmed that Padmavati's destiny was to marry Vishnu in his avatar as Srinivasa, the princess grew elated and recovered.

Following this revelation, Vakula Devi arrived at the palace of King Akasha Raja to formally propose the marriage between Srinivasa and Padmavati. The king accepted the proposal, and his advisor, Brihaspati, drafted the formal wedding invitation.

Srinivasa asked the gods for consent to his marriage with Padmavati. The deity also obtained a large loan from Kubera, the god of wealth, towards the expenses for the wedding as well as provide proof of his wealth. According to legends, Venkateswara married Padmavati at Kalyana Venkateswara Temple, Narayanavanam, after which they moved to Tirumala.

=== Residence ===
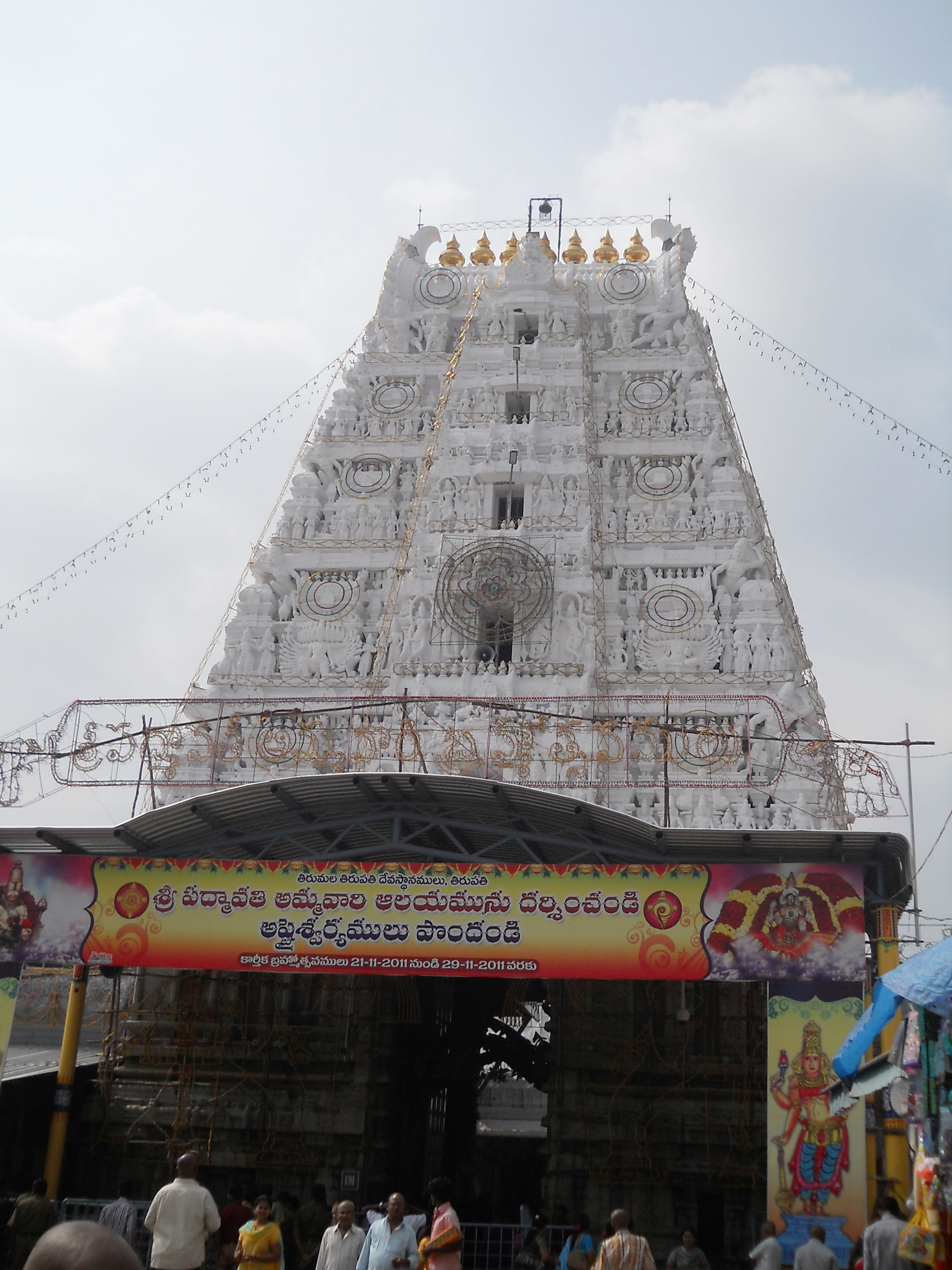
Rajagopuram of Tiruchanur Temple

About six months after the wedding, Lakshmi discovered that Vishnu had remarried. According to the legend, she traveled to find him, leading to a confrontation involving both Padmavati and Lakshmi. At this point, Vishnu transformed himself into a granite statue in front of them.

Brahma and Shiva then appeared to explain the situation to the two wives. They explained that Vishnu chose to take this stone form on the seven hills to help humanity overcome the troubles and hardships of the Kali Yuga. Upon hearing this, both Lakshmi and Padmavati also chose to turn into stone to stay with him forever. In the local iconography, Lakshmi takes her place on the left side of his chest, while Padmavati rests on the right.

== Iconography ==
Due to her identification with the goddess Lakshmi, Padmavati is revered as the goddess of wealth, prosperity, abundance, fertility, and beauty. Her primary symbol is the lotus, which is also reflected in her name. As the principal deity at the Tiruchanur Temple, she is depicted seated in the padmasana (lotus posture). Her lower hands are positioned in the abhayamudra (gesture of fearlessness) and varadamudra (gesture of granting boons), while her upper two hands hold individual lotuses. She is typically depicted in red or gold attire and adorned with ornate jewelry, indicating auspiciousness and divine royalty.

In Sri Vaishnavism, particularly in the Tenkalai sect, she is revered as the ultimate mother figure. Devotees believe that her grace and intercession are necessary to gain the favour of Vishnu and attain moksha (liberation).

== Worship and festivals ==
Padmavati is the presiding deity of the Tiruchanur temple and worship is centered on her grace. The temple strictly follows Pancharatra Agama traditions. Worship is based upon Padmavati not only as a divine consort to Venkateswara, but also a compassionate mother. It is considered essential to visit this temple to complete the pilgrimage to Tirumala.

Previously, annual Brahmotsavams of both Venkateswara and Padmavati used to happen around this temple, but was later shifted to Tirumala's Mada streets in the 12th century by Ramanuja.

=== Daily worship ===
In order, the daily rituals performed at Tiruchanur include Suprabhatam, Archana, Kumkumarchana, Kalyanotsavam, Oonjal Seva (Dolotsavam), Sahasra Deepalankarana Seva and Ekanta Seva. The weekly sevas include the Ashta Dala Pada Padmaradhana (Monday), Thiruppavada (Thursday), Abhishekam, Vastralankaraman & Lakshmi Puja (Friday) and Pushpanjali Seva (Saturday).

==== Kumkumarchana ====
Kumkumarchana is a ritual special to Tiruchanur where Kumkuma or vermilion is offered to the goddess while the Lakshmi Ashtottara and Sahasranama are chanted. On a daily basis, it done for individuals or families. This is mainly done by women for blessings for marriage, children and career as well.

On special occasions such as the start of the Annual Brahmotsavams, the Laksha Kumkumarchana is performed where Kumkuma is offered to the goddess while her divine names are chanted over 1,00,000 times.

==== Kalyanotsavam ====
The Kalyanotsavam is the divine union of Padmavati and a smaller-size idol or the Bhoga Srinivasa Murti. It starts with the Panchamurti Puja, followed by the Homam. It is followed by the lifting of the Tera (Veil) separating the deities after which garlands are exchanged. The auspicious Mangalya Dharana (Tying of the Mangalasutram) takes place followed by Talambralu (showers of Turmeric coated rice). The ceremony ends with Harathi and Asirvachanam to pilgrims.

=== Festivals ===
==== Kartika Brahmotsavams ====
It is a 9-day annual festival held during the Kartika month (November-December). It starts with the ankurarpanam (seed sowing) and dhvajarohanam or the hoisting of the flag at the dhvajastambha of the temple. The Utsava Padmavati Murti, beautifully dressed and richly ornamented is taken around the four streets of the temple in different Vahanas on each day. The Snapana Thirumanjanam is also performed everyday to the processional deity. The Brahmotsavams end with the Dhwajaavarohanam and finally the Pushpayagam.

==== Panchami Tirtham ====
On the 10th day of the annual Brahmotsavams, Panchami Tirtham starts with processions of royal elephants carryings loads of rich gifts of saris, Kumkuma, jewellery, pasupu (turmeric) etc. as a gift from Venkateswara in Tirumala to his wife. This is also known as Saare. This is followed by Chakratalvar and the idol of goddess Padmavati are given a celestial bath (Snapana Tirumanjanam) in the Pushkarni tank. This event celebrates the birth of goddess Padmavati. Following which, lakhs of devotees take a holy dip to obtain the grace of the goddess.

==== Varalakshmi Vratam ====
On this auspicious day, Padmavati is worshipped in eight different forms. It starts with the Sankalpa of participating families, followed by offerings and puja to the goddess. Then the Utsava Padmavati murti is taken out on the svarnaratha (golden chariot) for procession around the temple.

==== Navaratri ====
The Navaratri festival is celebrated over a period of 9 days which is kickstarted with the Snapana Tirumanjam or the sacred Abhishekam or the Padmavati utsava murti. Every evening for the next few days, the daily seva is converted into a large-scale, grand ceremony where the goddess is placed on a swing and worshipped. On the final day or Vijayadashami, the utsava murti is taken on the gajavahanam (elephant vehicle) outside the temple premises.

== Hymns ==
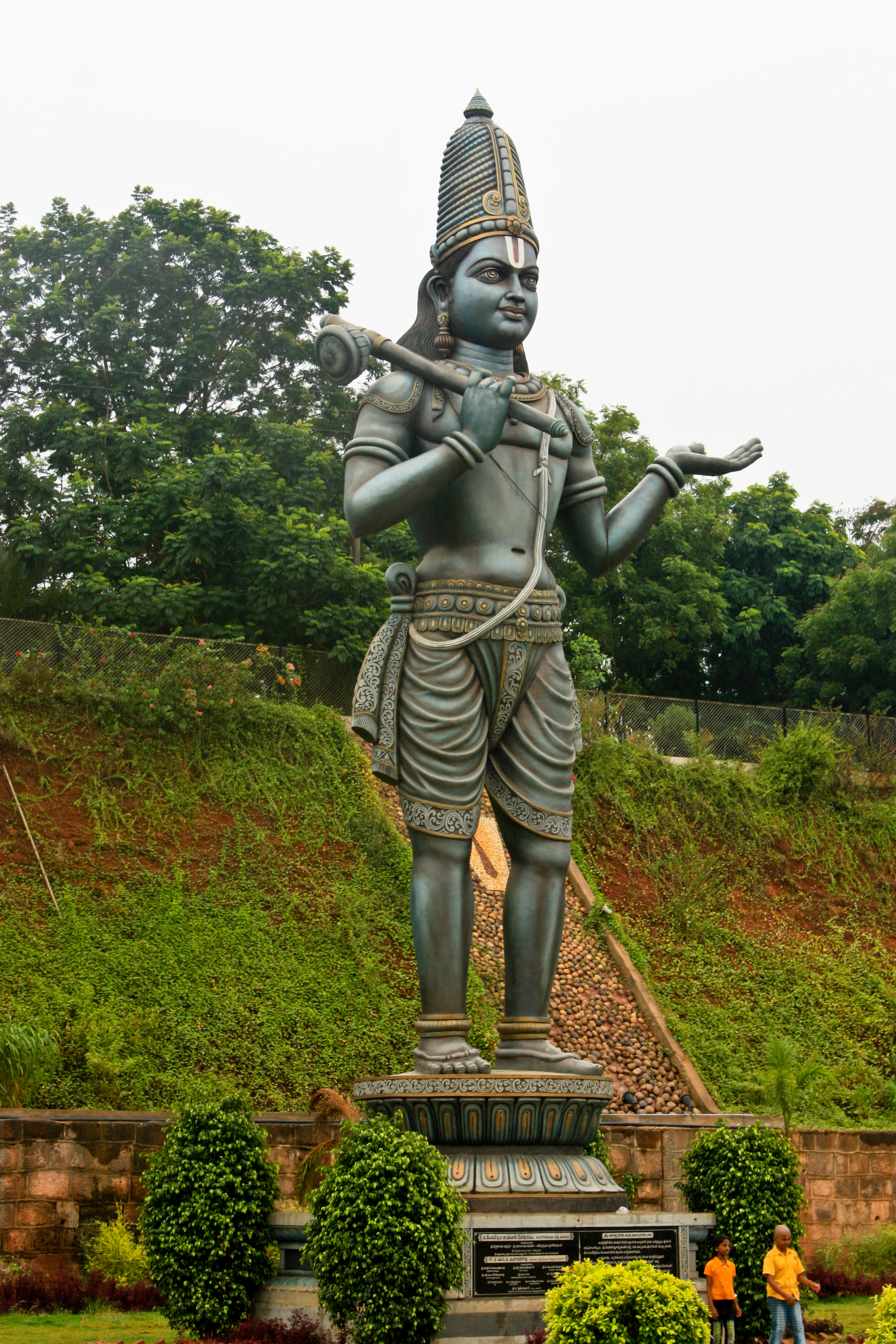
Tallapaka Annamacharya (c. 1408-1503)

The Padmavati Ashtottara Shatanamavali consists of 108 names of the goddess. This is mainly chancted during Ashtadala Pada Padmaradhana and daily Kumkumarchana sevas. The Lakshmi Sahasranama is chanted during general archana at Tiruchanur when flowers and tulasi leaves are offered to the goddess.

Tallapaka Annamacharya was a well-known Telugu poet who wrote a total of 32,000 compositions in praise of Venkateswara and Alamelu Manga. He portrayed her as the supreme divine consort, the embodiment of compassion, and the playful, enchanting enchantress to Venkateswara. He was a major proponent of sringara (romance) and madhura (melody) compositions. His main compositions dedicated to the goddess include Kshirabdi Kanyakaku, Vacchenu Alamelumanga, Meruguvantidi, Chakkani Talliki Changubhala, and Emani Poguduthume.

== See also ==
- Padmavati Temple
- Tiruchanur
- Sri Padmavati Mahila Visvavidyalayam, a university named after Padmavati
- Venkateswara Temple, Tirumala
- List of temples under Tirumala Tirupati Devasthanams
- Tirumala Tirupati Devasthanams
- Ammavaru
