= Tiruchanur =

Tiruchanuru Alamelu Mangapuram Alarmel Mangaipuram
- Neighborhood of Tirupati
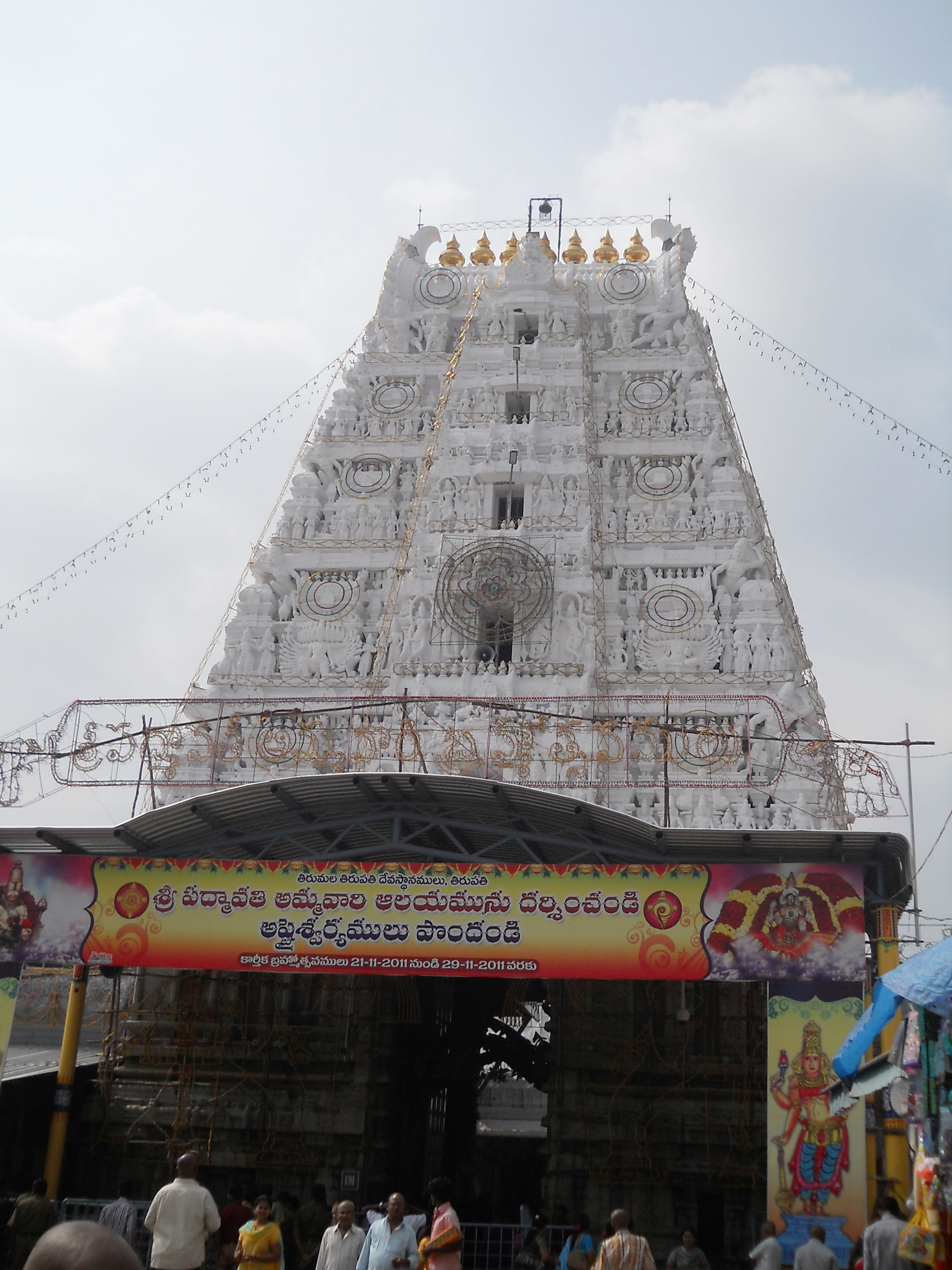
- Padmavathi Ammavari Temple

- Location in Andhra Pradesh, India
- Coordinates: 13°36′28.15″N 79°27′4.17″E
- Country: India
- State: Andhra Pradesh
- District: Tirupati district
- Mandal: Tirupati Rural Mandal
- City: Tirupati

Government
  - Body: Tirupati Urban Development Authority(TUDA)

Area
  - Total: 6.85 km^{2} (2.64 sq mi)
- Elevation: 17 m (56 ft)

Population (2011)
  - Total: 22,963
  - Density: 3,350/km^{2} (8,680/sq mi)

Languages
  - Official: Telugu
- Time zone: UTC+5:30 (IST)

Tiruchanur (also known as Alamelu Mangapuram or Alarmel Mangaipuram) is a suburb and outgrowth of Tirupati and is located in Tirupati district of the Indian state of Andhra Pradesh. It is a part of Tirupati urban agglomeration. It is the mandal headquarters of Tirupati Rural mandal. It is a religious destination for Hindu pilgrims due to the presence of Padmavathi Temple. It falls in the jurisdictional limit of Tirupati Urban Development Authority.

== Etymology ==
Based on evidence from thousands of inscriptions in and around Tirupati, it was called as Alamelu Mangapuram (Telugu: అలమేలుమంగాపురం) in Telugu and as Alarmel Mangaipuram (Tamil: அலர்மேல் மங்கைபுரம்) in Tamil.

== Transport ==
Alamelu mangapuram is located about 4 km from Tirupati central bus station and Tirupati Main railway station. It provides rail connectivity and is one of the satellite railway stations for Tirupati, which is under process of upgradation to a B category station. This place is famous for Kalyanamandapams and Function halls. People believe that it’s very auspicious to get married at Tiruchanur. TTD owns some function halls in Tollappa Gardens. Plenty of home stays/service apartments are also available for economical stay. Several restaurants are also available for the pilgrims coming to Tirupati.

== Education ==
The primary and secondary school education is imparted by government, aided and private schools, under the School Education Department of the state.
