= Tirumala Tirupati Devasthanams =

Hindu organization in Andhra Pradesh, India

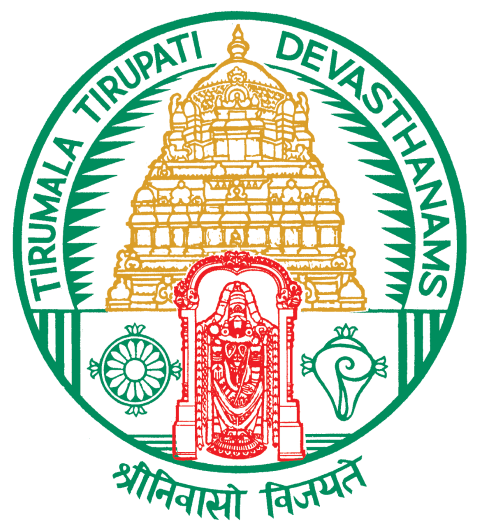
- Logo of TTD
- Abbreviation: TTD
- Formation: 1932; 94 years ago
- Type: Trust
- Purpose: Governing body for Tirumala Temple
- Headquarters: Tirupati, Andhra Pradesh, India
- Official language: Telugu
- Executive Officer: Muddada Ravichandra
- Affiliations: Government of Andhra Pradesh
- Budget: ₹5,456.26 crore (2026–2027)
- Website: ttdevasthanams.ap.gov.in www.tirumala.org

Tirumala Tirupati Devasthanams (TTD) is a trust set up by the Government of Andhra Pradesh, India. The trust primarily oversees the operations and finances of what is claimed to be the richest and most visited religious centre, Venkateswara Temple, Tirumala. It is involved in various social, religious, literary and educational activities. TTD is headquartered at Tirupati in Andhra Pradesh, India and employs about 16,000 people.

Srivani trust was set up by TTD in 2019 to promote Sanātana Dharma by constructing temples in SC-ST-BC habitations, renovating ancient temples, and providing funds under Dhup-Deepa-Naivedyam Scheme to those temples facing financial difficulty. By January 2023, TTD has taken up construction of 2,068 temples in Andhra Pradesh, Telangana, Tamil Nadu, Pondicherry and Karnataka.

The total net worth of the organization in 2024 is ₹3 trillion (US$32 billion) (₹3 lakh crore), making it the richest Hindu temple board in the world.

== Establishment and legislative setting ==
TTD was established in 1932 as a result of the TTD Act of 1932. According to the act administration of the temple was vested in a committee of seven members and overseen by a paid commissioner appointed by the Government of Madras Presidency. Advising the committee were two advisory councils – one composed of priests and temple administrators to aid the committee with the operations of the Tirumala temple, and another composed of farmers for advice on Tirumala's land and estate transactions.

The Andhra Pradesh Charitable and Hindu Religious Institution and Endowments Act (1969), sections 85 to 91, expanded the provisions of TTD. The number of trustees was expanded from five to eleven with compulsory representation from certain communities. Apart from the responsibilities defined in the previous act, Devasthanam was obliged to promote the study of Indian languages and propagate Hindu dharma by research, teaching, training and literature creation.

The A.P. Charitable & Hindu Religious Institutions & Endowments Act (1987) superseded the 1979 act. The Board of Trustees' membership was expanded from a maximum of eleven to fifteen and the hereditary rights of temple priests and their right to garner a share of the hundi proceeds were abolished. After increased pressure from the priests over a long period, the Andhra Pradesh government made an amendment to the act in 2006, to discontinue these two controversial clauses. It is mandatory for non-Hindus visiting the temple to sign a declaration form before entering the temple, stating that they have faith in the presiding deity, Lord Venkateswara.

== Temples under TTD Administration ==
Tirumala Tirupati Devasthanams trust primarily manages the administration of Lord Venkateswara Temple, Tirumala. It also manages many other temples in Tirupati and all around the world. The temples include both historical and new temples which were constructed by TTD itself.

== TTD Chairmans ==
S.No	Year	Name	Place
1	2024–26	Bollineni Rajagopal Naidu	Hyderabad
2	2023–24	Bhumana Karunakar Reddy	Tirupati
3	2019–23	Yerram Venkata Subba Reddy	Ongole
4	2017–19	Putta Sudhakar Yadav	Kadapa
5	2015–17	Chadalawada Krishnamurthy	Tirupati
6	2011–14	Kanumuri Bapi Raju	Eluru
7	2008–11	D. K. Adikesavulu Naidu	Chittoor
8	2006–08	Bhumana Karunakar Reddy	Tirupati
9	2004–06	Thikkavarapu Subbarami Reddy	Visakhapatnam
10	2003–04	D. K. Adikesavulu Naidu	Chittoor
11	2001–03	Pappala Chalapathirao	Anakapalle
12	1996–99	Kagitha Venkata Rao	Pedana
13	1994–96	Kimidi Kalavenkata Rao	Srikakulam
14	1993–94	A.Chengal Reddy	Tirupati
15	1980–83	B. Nagi Reddi	Kadapa
16		G.Ranga Raju	Undi
17		C. S. C. V. M. Raju	Ungutur
18		V.K.D.V.Suryanarayanaraju	Atilli
19	1964–66	Kalluri Chandramouli	Bapatla
20		Pydi Narasimhapparao	Srikakulam

== Departments ==
TTD has almost all the responsibilities that a government has, including departments for production (laddus), engineering (dams and roads), water supply, human resources, transport, procurement and marketing, finance and accounting, public relations, information technology, forest and gardens, educational institutions and hospitals, revenue and general administration.

== Services ==
TTD provides various services for pilgrims to Tirumala and Tirupati, including bus services, food and accommodation. It maintains the queue management system, facilitates head tonsure and distribution of laddu. It runs information and ticketing centers in the major towns and cities across the country. It maintains various marriage halls, degree colleges, junior colleges and high schools. Sri Venkateswara Central Library and Research Centre (SVCLRC), established by TTD in 1993, houses approximately 40,000 volumes of books, mainly on religion and philosophy. The Research Wing works towards studying and publishing material related to the Hindu religion, produces authentic papers on original Sanskrit texts, and provide translations of major Hindu works in various languages, including Telugu.

Dharma Prachara Parishad was established to propagate the Hindu dharma. TTD also helps promote the age-old cultural heritage of India, in the areas of traditional sculpture and architecture, temple renovation and reconstructions and restoration of Hindu sculptures. Complex queueing algorithms and emerging technologies have been evaluated and implemented to manage the huge crowds with Tata Consultancy Services designing and implementing the software and hardware infrastructure for queue management along with other companies.

TTD has released a schedule for every month tickets release.

Darsanam Type	Ticketing Dates of Every Month
Special Entry Darshan tickets of cost ₹300	24
Electronic Dip Registration for Arjitha Sevas (Suprabhatham, Thomala, Archana and Astadala Pada Padmaradhana)	18,19, 20
Payment for Dip Registration if ticket gets allotted	20, 21, 22
Both Virtual & In-person Arjitha Sevas (Kalyanostavam, Arjitha Bramhostavam, Unjan Seva & Sahasra Deepalankarana Sevas).	21
SriVani, Angapradhakshinam, Senior Citizens & Physically challenged quota	23
Online Tirupati Accommodation Quota	24
Online Tirumala Accommodation Quota	24

=== Annaprasadam ===
The food offerings as "Annaprasadams" are being undertaken by TTD in a massive way in the Matrusri Tarigonda Vengamamba Annaprasadam Complex, donated by Matrsuri Tarigonda Ananta Koti Raju at Tirumala, in all the waiting queue lines and compartments of Vaikuntam Queue Complex I and II, footpath routes, etc.

Donations given by devotees equal nearly ₹13 crore every month. Auctions of human hair fetched a revenue of ₹150 crores in 2011 and ₹203 crores in 2012. Temple admission ticket sales fetched a revenue of $25 million in 2007. Laddu, a confectionery, is offered as Lord's prasadam. TTD has procured machines from MICO BOSCH to automate the manufacture of laddus. Sale of laddus fetched a revenue of staggering $10 million in 2007.

=== Education ===
- Sri Venkateswara Vedic University, Tirumala
- Sri Venkateswara Arts College, Tirupati
- Sri Venkateswara Institute of Traditional Sculpture and Architecture, Tirupati
- Sri Venkateswara College of Music and Dance, Tirupati
- Sri Venkateswara Ayurvedic College, Tirupati
- Sri Venkateswara Yoga Institute, Tirupati
- Sri Venkateswara Polytechnic for the Physically Challenged (SVPPC), Tirupati
- Sri Padmavati Women's Degree and PG College (A), Tirupati
- Sri Venkateswara Government Polytechnic College, Tirupati
- Sri Padmavathi Mahila Polytechnic College, Tirupati
- Sri Venkateswara College, New Delhi
- Sri Venkateswara Junior College (Boys) TTD's, Tirupati-- Sri Padmavathi Women's Junior College, TTD's, Tirupati

=== Hospitals ===
TTD acts as a major stake holder in the following hospitals

- Sri Venkateswara Ramnarain Ruia Government General Hospital
- Sri Venkateswara Institute of Medical Sciences
- Government Maternity Hospital, Tirupati

=== Sri Venkateswara Gosamrakshana Shala ===
It is a preserve for cattle received as a donation (Godanam). It was established in the year 1956 by TTD and later renamed to S.V. Gosamrakshana Shala during 2004. It is located at Chandragiri Road, Tirupati. It is maintained by Tirumala Tirupati Devasthanams based on the funds received under Sri Venkateswara Gosamrakshana Shala Trust. Activities of the trust include providing a good environment, management and food to the cattle. The milk and its products produced here are used by TTD for daily rituals at Sri Venkateswara Temple and other TTD temples.

=== Free bus services ===
TTD runs a free bus service between the Tirupati railway station and bus station to Alipiri and Srivari Mettu, every 30 minutes. Pilgrims who intend to walk up the hills to Tirumala use these buses. TTD also provides busing within Tirumala town, which are known as "Dharma Rathams". There are 12 such buses that pass-through cottages, choultries, temples and other places in Tirumala, at a frequency of every 3 minutes in the prescribed time slots.

== Media and publications ==
- Sri Venkateswara Bhakti Channel
- Sapthagiri Magazine

== See also ==
- Alamelu Mangapuram
- Tirumala Brahmotsavalu
- Tirupati laddu
