= History of Tirumala Venkateswara Temple =

Vaishnavite temple

Venkateswara Temple is an important Vaishnavite temple situated in the hill town of Tirumala in Tirupati district of Andhra Pradesh, built by a Tamil king Tondaiman and later expanded and renovated under the Chola and Vijayanagara Empire. The Temple is dedicated to Lord Venkateswara, an incarnation of Vishnu, who is believed to have appeared here to save mankind from the trials and troubles of Kali Yuga. The temple is situated at a height of 853 metres on Tirumala Hills which are part of Seshachalam Hills and is constructed in South Indian Tamil Architectural Style.

== Medieval history ==
The first recorded endowment was made by Pallava queen Samavai in the year 966 CE. She donated many jewels and two parcels of land (one 10 acres and the other 13 acres) and ordered to use the revenues generated from that land to be used for the celebration of major festivals in the temple. The Pallava dynasty (9th century), the Chola dynasty (10th century), Reddi Kingdom (12th and 13th centuries) and Vijayanagara pradhans (14th and 15th centuries) were committed devotees of Lord Venkateswara. The temple gained most of its current wealth and size under the Vijayanagara Empire, with the donation of diamonds and gold. In 1517, Vijayanagara Emperor Krishnadevaraya, on one of his many visits to the temple, donated gold and jewels, enabling the Ananda Nilayam (inner shrine) roofing to be gilded. After the decline of Vijayanagara Empire, leaders from states such as the Kingdom of Mysore and the Gadwal Samsthanam worshiped as pilgrims and gave ornaments and valuables to the temple.

== Modern history ==
After the dusk of Vijayanagara Empire, the temple went into the hands of Golconda in July 1656 and then it was under the French for a short period of time and under Nawab of Carnatic till 1801 CE.

=== 11th to 16th century ===
Ramanujacharya visited Tirupati thrice. On the first occasion, he spent a year with his uncle, Tirumalai Nambi, learning the esoteric meaning of Ramayana. His second visit was for settling a dispute that arose between the Saivites and Vaishnavites regarding the nature of the image set up in the Tirumala temple. During the last visit, which was at an advanced old age of 102 years, the acharya installed the image of Govindaraja and laid the foundations of the present town of Tirupati. Ramanuja streamlined the rituals at Tirumala temple according to Vaikanasa Agama tradition and introduced the recitation of Naalayira Divya Prabandham. He also set up Tirupati Jeeyar Mutt in 1119AD in consultation with Tirumalai Ananthalwan to institutionalize service to the Lord and supervise the temple rituals. The Jeeyars to this day ensure that the rituals ordained by Ramanuja are observed.

In 1417 AD, Madhavadasa, a resident of Chandragiri, constructed Tirumamani Mandapam which is present in front of Bangaru Vakili of the Garbhagriha.

In 1535 AD, Pedda Tirumalacharya renovated Temple Tank and Adivaraha shrine.

=== 19th century ===
With the advent of British during the early 19th century, the management of the temple passed to hands of East India Company, who accorded special status to temple and avoided interference in temple activities. Madras government passed Regulation seven of 1817, which passed the temple to Board of Revenue through collector of North Arcot District. In 1821, Bruce of England had drawn rules for the management of Temple which is referred to as Bruce's Code.

In 1843 the East India Company transferred the Administration of Temple along with other Temples in Tirupati to Mahants of Hathiramji Muth, who acted as Vicaranakartas.

=== 20th century ===
The Temple was under the rule of Mahants for six generations until 1933 when Tirumala Tirupati Devasthanams was formed as a result of the TTD Act in 1933. The Act of 1933 was superseded by Madras Hindu Religious and Charitable Endowment Act of 1951. Again in 1966, the temple was placed under direct control of Andhra Pradesh State Endowments Department, with Andhra Pradesh Charitable and Hindu Religious Institutions and Endowments act. In 1979, act of 1966 was rolled back with new Tirumala Tirupati Devasthanams act, where temple administration was vested to a committee consisting of Executive officer, Chairman and two other members nominated by Government of Andhra Pradesh.

== Epigraphical records ==
This Temple bears on its walls several Tamil inscriptions which are of historical, cultural and linguistic importance. The number of inscriptions on the Hill Temple and in the temples of Lower Tirupati and Tiruchanur exceed one thousand. There is evidence to suggest that many early Tamil inscriptions on the walls of the temples have disappeared beyond recovery. As many as 640 inscriptions are found engraved on the walls of the temple. They are published by the Tirumala Tirupati Devasthanams along with the inscriptions found in other related temples in and around Tirupati. All the inscriptions are mainly in Tamil in the wall of sherin has more inscription script than other mentioned languages. Kannada, Sanskrit, Telugu.

Additionally, in the temple, there is a unique collection of about 3,000 copper plates on which the Telugu Sankirtanas of Tallapaka Annamacharya and his descendants are inscribed. This collection forms a valuable source of material for a historical linguist in Telugu apart from its importance to musicologists.

Under the patronage of almost all important dynasties of South India, this sacred Temple of Tirumala enjoyed full benefits and glory. The Pallavas, the Cholas, the Pandyas, Kadavarayas, Yadavarayas, Cholas, Vijayanagara kings (Sangama, Saluva and Tuluva lines) have left the marks of their patronage and endowments on the walls of the temples of Tirumala and Tirupati.
