= Ugra Srinivasa =

Ugra Srinivasa is one of the idols in the Tirumala Venkateshvara Temple at Tirumala, Andhra Pradesh. Ugra means anger and Srinivasa means Venkateshvara with this idol being originally called Venkatatturaivar and this idol is showing the angry form of Venkateshvara. He is also known as Snapana Murti.

== Legend ==
Legend has it that fire broke out in the village destroying houses during Srivari Brahmotsavam at Tirumala in the 14th century A.D. When prayers were offered to the God, a vision appeared to a devotee with a message from Srinivasa himself. With the change in times, the Ugra Srinivasa idol could no longer remain the procession idol and a new idol would be found as utsava murti (Malayappa Svami). The Ugra Srinivasa idol is no longer brought out of the temple after sunrise and it is believed that sunrays touching the idol would spark fire in the temple complex.

== History ==
Apart from Dhruva Bera, the idol of Ugra Srinivasa is the oldest idol in the temple. The date when the idol was consecrated is unknown though records indicate that the idol existed much before the Bhoga Srinivasa was presented in the 10th century AD. Records show that the idol was used as utsava murti till the 14th century A.D. when Malayappa Svami was found and used as utsava murti.

The name Venkatatturaivar means 'The resident God of Venkatam' in Tamil language.

== Worship ==
The idol is about 18 inches long and has a base pedestal 7 inches high. The Sudarshana Chakra in the hand of the Lord is called Prayoga Chakra as it is in a slightly tilted way as if ready for use. The idol has frowning eyebrows to represent an angry face. Bhudevi and Sridevi are also found as standing figures and have the same frowning eyebrows.

The worship is proportioned solely to this idol on three occasions in a year - Uttana Ekadasi, Mukkoti Dvadasi, Dvadasaradhana. The idol is bought in procession at wee hours only on Kaisika Dvadasi (also known as Mukkoti Dvadasi) while the idol is worshipped inside the temple complex on the remaining two occasions.

=== Relevance of Kaisika Dvadasi ===
Sri Vaishnavas called Prabodhotsava or Uttana Dvadasi as Kaisika Dvadasi. On the Uttana Dvadasi, preparations are made for waking Vishnu, who went to sleep on Ashada Shukla Ekadasi (Vishnu Sayana Ekadasi). Among Sri Vaishnavas, this Dvadasi is known as Kaisika Dvadasi named after the ragam of a song which was used last in praise of the Lord by devotee Chandala Bhakta Nambaduvan. Bhakta Nambaduvan kept his word and returned to a Rakshasa (demon) to offer his body to be devoured as food by the hungry Rakshasa and Vishnu drives the Rakshasa away and saves him. The reading of the Kaisika Purana, which is specially composed in a dialect which is a mixture (manipravalam) of Sanskrit and Tamil and Telugu interspersed with Sanskrit quotations and vernacular explanations is the special feature of the early hours of the morning before day break.
