= Srivari Brahmotsavam =

Annual lunar festival

Srivari Brahmotsavams శ్రీవారి బ్రహ్మొత్సవములు
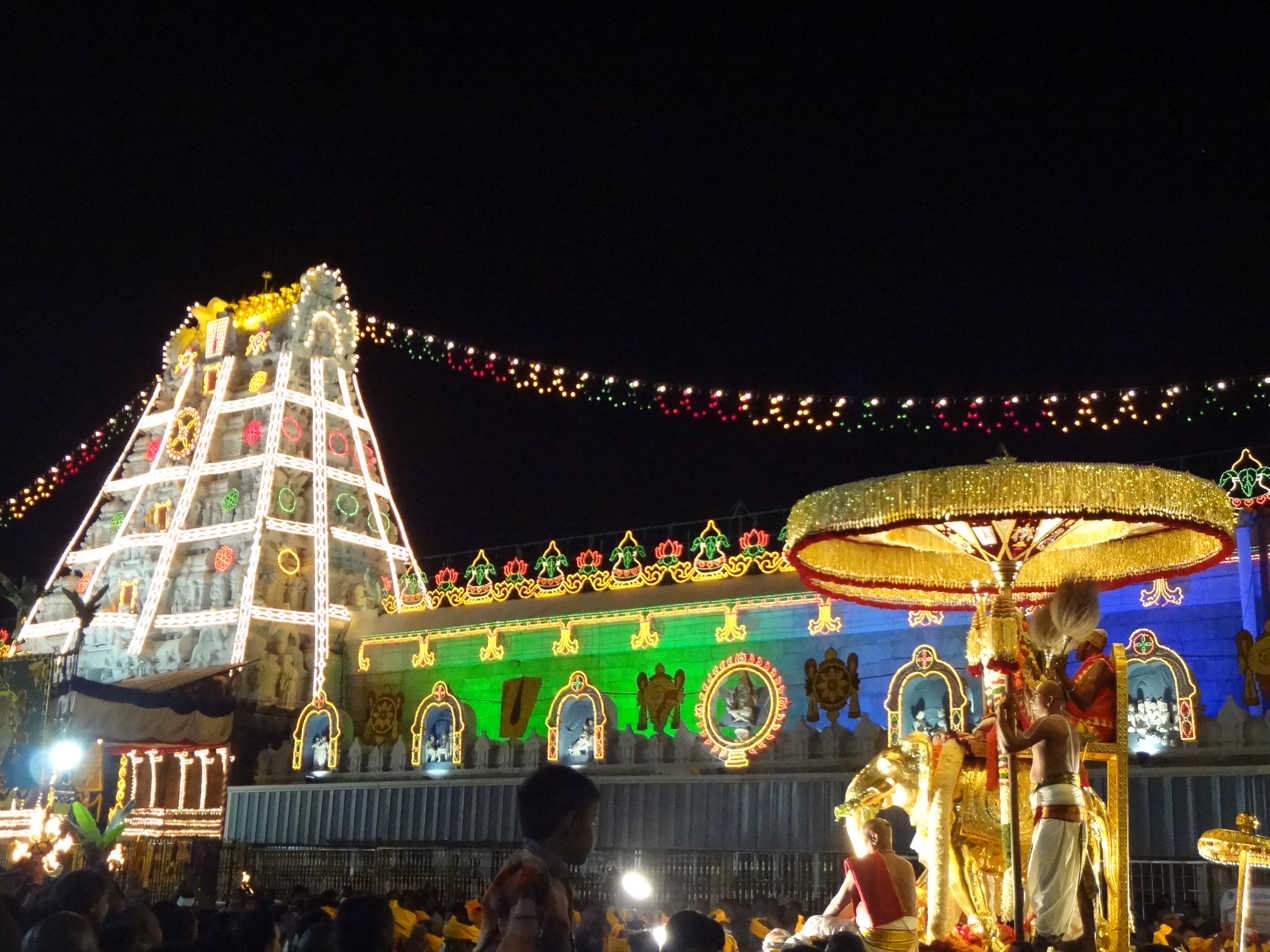
- Venkateswara Temple in Brahmotsavams
- Official name: Sri Venkateswara Brahmotsavams
- Also called: Tirumala Brahmotsavams, Tirupati Brahmotsavams
- Observed by: Hindus
- Celebrations: The Malayappa (Shree Bhoo Sahita)(processional deity) of Venkateswara Temple, Tirumala is taken on the morning and evening of the nine-day festival on four streets around the shrine. Celebrations include dance, music, elephants and horses.
- Duration: Nine days
- Frequency: Annual
- Related to: Venkateswara Temple, Tirumala

Sri Venkateswara Swami Vari Brahmotsavam or Srivari Brahmotsavam is the most significant annual festival celebrated at the Venkateswara Temple in Tirumala-Tirupati, Tirupati district, Andhra Pradesh, India. which falls between the Telugu calendar of Aasveeyujamu and the Gregorian calendar months of September or October.

The Utsava-murti (processional deity) of the presiding deity, Venkateswara, and his consorts Sridevi and Bhudevi are taken on a procession on several vahanams on the streets surrounding the temple. The celebration attracts pilgrims and tourists from all over India and around the world. A Brahmotsavam is a cleansing ceremony in honor of Brahma, and the ceremony at Tirumala is the largest.

== Etymology ==
The word Brahmotsavam is a combination of two Sanskrit words—Brahma and utsavam (festival)—and Brahma reportedly conducted the first festival. Brahma also means "grand" or "large".

== History and legend ==
According to the legend of Tirumala, Brahma descends to earth to conduct the festival. Sri Venkteswara Sahasranamastotra refers to Brahma performing the festival, signified by a small, empty wooden chariot (brahmaratham) which moves ahead of the processions of the Venkateswara processional deity Malayappa.

The first reference to festivals in the Tirumala Venkateswara Temple was in 966 CE, when the Pallava queen Samavai endowed land and ordered its revenue to celebrate festivals in the temple. Until 1582, Brahmotsavams were held as often as 12 times a year.

== Celebrations ==
Dwajarohanam
A ceremony on the first day, when a flag with a picture of Garuda (the vehicle of Vishnu) is hoisted over the temple. The flag is believed to be a symbolic invitation to the Hindu deities to attend the festival. After the ceremony, the Andhra Pradesh chief minister offers new silk clothes to Venkateswara.
Chinna Shesha Vahanam
On the morning of the second day, The processional deity of Sri Malayappa Swami, donning the role of Sri Krishna, will be taken for a pleasure ride on the five - hooded golden Chinna Sesha vahanam in all his majestic display of power and strength.
Garuda Vahanam
On the evening of the fifth day, Venkateswara and Garuda are carried in a procession and decorated with garlands of flowers. Every year, the Tirupati Venkateswara garland is sent to the Srivilliputtur Andal Temple for the marriage festival of Andal.
Hanumantha Vahanam
On the morning of the sixth day morning, Venkateswara and Hanuman are taken out in procession.
Chakra Snanam
On the morning of the ninth day, the Malayappa, his two consorts and the Sudarshana Chakra are carried in procession to the Varahaswamy Temple. After the abhishekam and presentation of food offerings, the Sudarshana Chakra and its devotees are bathed in the temple tank.

== See also ==
- Venkateswara
- Tirumala Tirupati Devasthanams

== Sources ==
- Sharma, Arvind; Young, Katherine K., eds. (1999). Feminism and World Religions. Albany: State University of New York Press. ISBN 0-7914-4023-0.
- "Tirupati dresses up for Brahmotsavam". The Times of India. 6 October 2002. Archived from the original on 14 October 2012.
- "Crafts mela to coincide with Brahmotsavam". The Hindu. 17 September 2001. Archived from the original on 18 December 2019.
