= Abhideyaka Abhishekam =

Indian festival

Lord Malayappa swami as seen after Abhideyaka Abhishekam in his diamond kavacham

Abhideyaka Abhishekam is a festival conducted in the Tirumala Venkateswara Temple, Andhra Pradesh in India. The purpose of the festival is to conduct special Abhishekam to protect the Utsava deities — Lord Malayappa swami and his consorts Sridevi and Bhudevi from damage that might occur while conducting processions and Tirumanjanam (holy baths).

== Festival details ==
Lord Malayappa swami and his consorts as seen in their pearl kavacham during Abhideyaka Abhishekam festival

The festival is performed in the Hindu calendar month of Jyesta. In the Gregorian Calendar, this falls in June/July. Because of the association with the Jyesta month, the festival is also called as Jyestabhishekam.

The festival lasts three days and on each of these days, after the second bell, the lord and his consorts are taken to the Kalyanotsava mantapa (Hall used for celestial wedding) and Snapana Tirumanjanam is conducted amidst vedic chants. Snapana Tirumanjanam involves performing a bath to the deities involving holy and consecrated water mixed with spices including turmeric. The lord and his consorts are attired in different kavacham (armours) on each of these days.

Lord Malayappa swami and his consorts as seen in their gold kavacham during Abhideyaka Abhishekam festival

- First Day: Vajrakavacham (armour studded with diamonds)
- Second Day: Muthyala kavcham (armour studded with pearls)
- Third Day: Svarna kavacham (armour of gold) on the third day.

The Svarna kavacham is adorned to the Lord and his consorts throughout the year as well.

== Festival history ==
There is no record on the history of the festival and the start dates.

== Pilgrim access ==
The festival is considered as Arjitha Seva (paid service) and hence devotees can pay to view the performance of the Abhishekam. The purchase of a ticket allows access five people to the Kalyanotsava mantapa and the primary ticket holder is gifted Vastram (one upper cloth and a blouse), one laddu and one vada.
