= Kagganapalli Radha Devi =

Indian activist

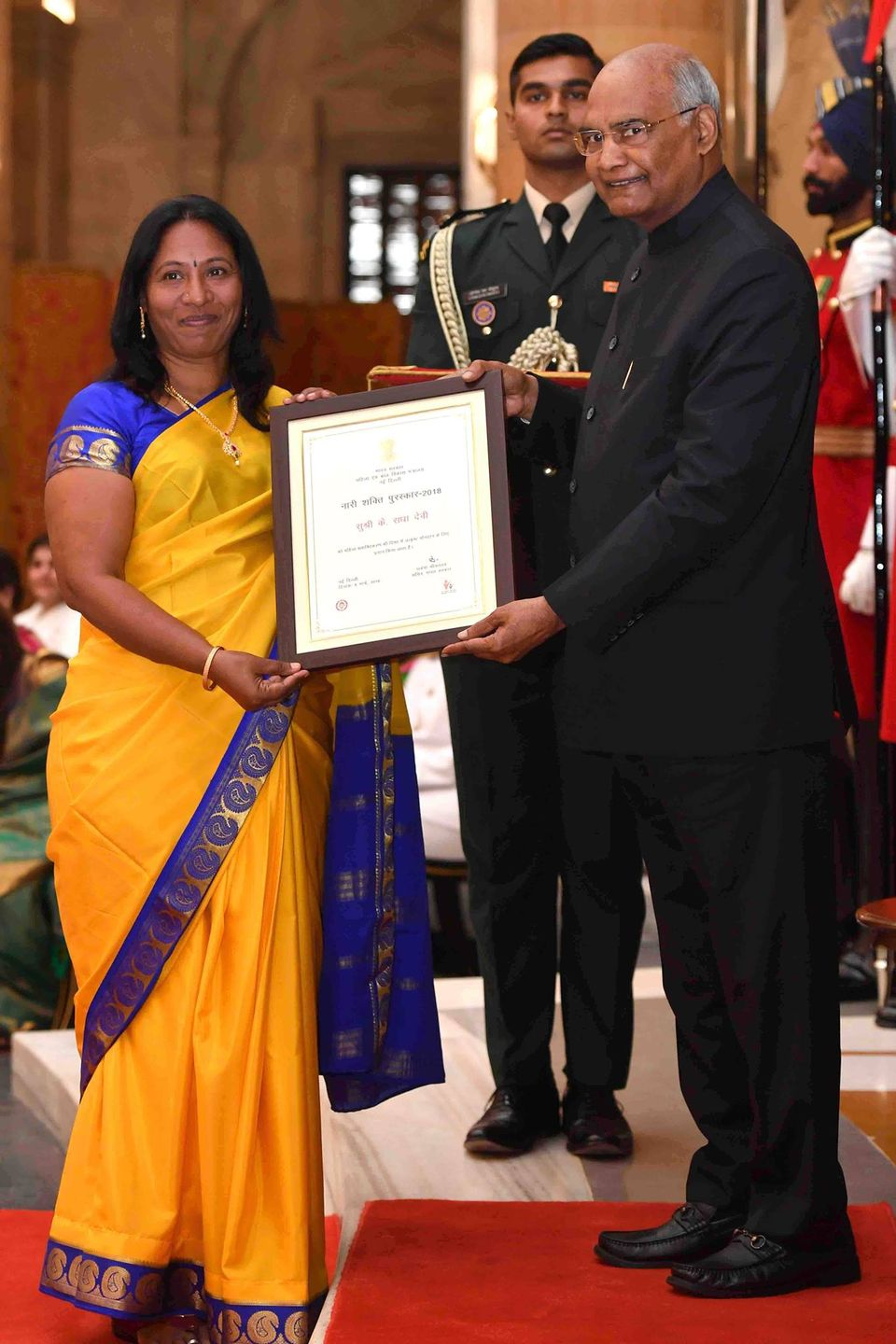
- Radha Devi Kagganapalli receiving the Nari Shakti Puraskar in March 2019 Nari Shakti Puraskar
- Education: Bachelor of Administration
- Occupations: Founder & President Women barbers in Tirumala
- Organization(s): Rail Hostess & Hospitality Management | Indira Institute of RailCrew (IIR) | Eco Finix Waste Management solutions | Xinc Innovations Pvt. ltd
- Known for: Women Empowerment in winning a protest against a Hindu Temple's sexual discrimination
- Awards: Nari Shakti Puraskar
- Honors: Shrama Shakti Award from Govt Of Andhra Pradesh

Kagganapalli Radha Devi is an Indian activist who successfully protested against a Hindu temple that would only employ male barbers. The Venkateswara Temple, Tirumala, which gathers over a ton of hair every day, agreed to also employ female barbers to carry out the ritual tonsuring. Devi received the Nari Shakti Puraskar in recognition of her work.

== Life ==
Radha Devi was the President of the Association of Andhra Pradesh Women Barbers. She was also the President of the Tirumala Tirupathi Devasthanams Women Barbers and these barbers were concerned that they were prevented in cutting hair at a Hindu temple because they were women. Radha Devi decided to champion their case.

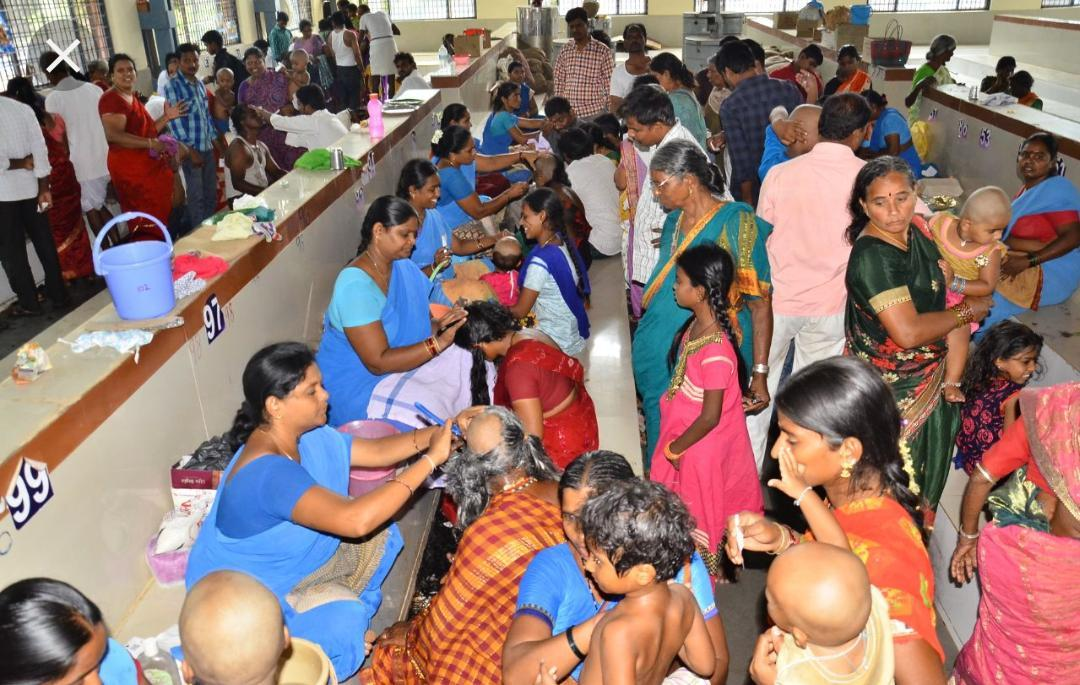
Women being tonsured by women at booth 97 and 99 at Venkateswara Temple

Many devotees have their head tonsured daily as an offering to God at the Venkateswara Temple in Tirumala in Andhra Pradesh. The amount of hair collected every day weighs over a ton. The hair is collected and stored in large warehouses and it is sold internationally creating a substantial profit for the temple. The hair is high quality and commands prices as high as $166/kg as it is used to make wigs outside of India.

The hair-cutting tradition comes from a story that is told in which Venkateswara's head was hurt by a cowherd and his scalp had a bald patch. This was noticed by Neela Devi, a Gandharva princess who cut a portion of her hair and she transplanted it to his head. Venkateswara then announced that at the place where it happened, his followers should cut their hair and give it as an offering.

In 2004 there was a reaction from Orthodox Jews when they were told that they could not wear wigs made from this ritually gathered hair. Many wigs were destroyed but the price of the hair remained stable. Traditionally the barbers employed to do the tonsuring were male and members of the Nayee caste. This caused some discrimination and requests from women that they would prefer a female barber. A protest led by Radha Devi overturned the objections and she was recognized with the Nari Shakti Puraskar, presented by Ram Nath Kovind, the President of India. The awards were made at the President's palace, Rashtrapati Bhavan, in New Delhi on International Women's Day 2019. She met the minister Maneka Gandhi and afterwards she met the Prime Minister Narendra Modi.
