= Mahalakshmi Temple, Kallur =

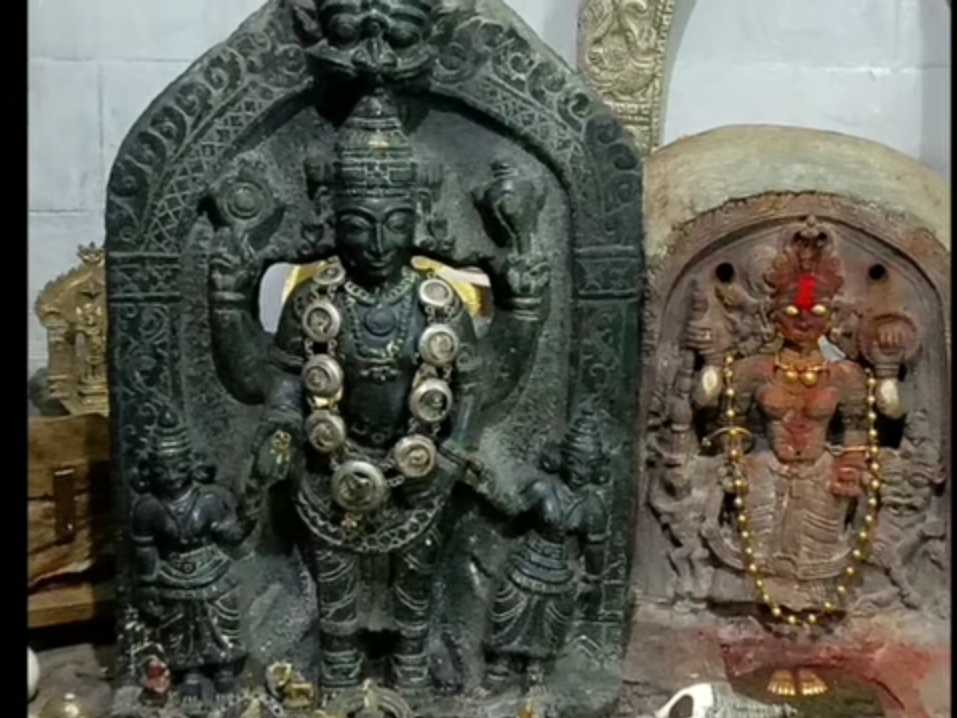
- Swayambhu Venkateshwara (Left) and Swayambhu Mahalakshmi with her Simha Vahan (right)

Religion
- Affiliation: Hinduism
- Deity: Mahalakshmi Venkateshwara
- Festivals: Navratri, Diwali, Lakshmi Puja

Location
- Location: Kallur, Raichur district
- State: Karnataka
- Country: India

Kallur Sri Mahalakshmi Temple is a prominent Hindu temple dedicated to goddess Mahalakshmi with her husband Venkateswara. The temple is located in Kallur village, Raichur District, Karnataka, India. Often referred to as Dakshina Kolhapur. or second Kolhapur. The shrine holds immense significance among Vaishnava and Shakta traditions due to its close spiritual association with the famous Mahalakshmi Temple, Kolhapur.

== Legends ==
According to historical records and local tradition, the temple was founded during the period of Bijapur's Adil Shahi rule by Sri Lakshmikanta Acharya (also known as Srinivasa Acharya), a devout Madhva scholar. Lakshmikanta Acharya originally ran a Vedic Gurukul in Bijapur. Following regional political instability, he migrated with his family and students to Kallur, a village situated near Raichur. Lakshmikanta Acharya was an ardent devotee of Goddess Mahalakshmi of Kolhapur and maintained a lifelong vow to visit her temple in Kolhapur every year during Navaratri. When he reached 88 years of age, his failing health made the long, arduous journey impossible. Deeply grieved, he prayed for divine guidance. The goddess then appeared in his dream, reassuring him that because of his steadfast devotion, she would manifest directly at his home in Kallur. The following morning, while Acharya was preparing sandalwood paste (gandha) by rubbing a sandalwood block on a sandstone slab (sankal / sanekallu), an outline of goddess Mahalakshmi gradually emerged on the stone. The image fully defined itself, creating a self-manifested (Swayambhu) idol. Acharya subsequently consecrated part of his residence as a shrine to house the deity.

Shortly after the manifestation of Goddess Mahalakshmi, a farmer’s plough became stuck in a field near Mamadapura village. Upon excavating the site under Acharya’s direction, a black stone idol of Lord Venkateshwara flanked by Sridevi and Bhudevi was uncovered. The idol was brought to the shrine and installed alongside Mahalakshmi. Sri Anjaneya (Mukhyaprana): In the temple, a slab of stone used daily to support holy water (Theertham) gradually revealed an outlined image of Lord Anjaneya (Hanuman). It was formally consecrated facing west toward the sanctum.

== Iconography ==
The self-manifested (Swayambhu) idol depicts Goddess Mahalakshmi with four arms, holding a Matulinga fruit (Citron) in her lower right hand, a Kaumodaki (heavy mace) in her upper right hand, a Khetaka (shield) in her upper left hand, and a Panapatra (bowl) in her lower left hand, with a lion (Simha Vahanam) standing as her mount at her base. Beside is the chaturbhuja (four-armed) self-manifested idol of Lord Venkateshwara.

== See also ==
- Mahalakshmi Temple, Kolhapur
- Venkateswara Temple, Tirumala
