= Koluvu Srinivasa =

Koluvu Srinivasa Idol in Tirumala Temple

Koluvu Srinivasa is an idol of Lord Venkateswara in the Tirumala Venkateswara Temple, Andhra Pradesh. This silver idol that resembles the main deity represents the presiding officer for all activities and rituals in the temple. Koluvu Srinivasa is regarded as the guardian deity of the temple and presides over all its financial and economic affairs. The idol is also called as Bali Bera. The duties of the Bali Bera closely resemble that of the householder. He manages the finances and accounts, and his permission is sought before offering Bali to Nityasuris like Garuda, Hanuman and Vishvaksena on the Balipeetham. There is no recorded history of the deity leaving the innermost 16-pillared hall (Tirumamani Mantapam).

There is no reference in the temple of when the idol was obtained, its identity or the start of rituals involving the idol.

== Daily Seva: Koluvu ==
After the morning Thomala Seva or (Abhishekam (on Fridays), the accounts of the previous day is closed and submitted to the lord. This ritual is called Koluvu and is also called Durbar. Koluvu Srinivasa is brought to the Tirumamani mantapam (inside the sanctum sanctorum) and seated on a silver-plated chair with a canopy of gilt umbrella presented by the Maharajah of Mysore. This ritual is conducted in Ekantam, and only the priests and TTD officials are present. The following rituals are held:

- Mixture of fried gingelly seeds and jaggery is offered to the Lord.
- Texts from the Vedas, Vishnu Suktam and Tamil Divya Prabandhams are read.
- Then the Lord is requested to listen to the Panchangam (almanac) when the priest says, "PanchAngam AgamyatAm". Panchangam (day's calendar) is read to the Lord with the activities that will be undertaken for the day as well as activities of the next day. Details of festivals and observances in the Tirumala temple and those at the temples of Govindaraja Swami and Kodandarama Swami at Tirupati, Padmavathi Devi at Tiruchanur, Sri Kalahastiswara at Sri Kalahasti and several other nearby temples are read out.
- A TTD official then reads out the previous day's hundi collection details with the date, morning collection, afternoon collection and the loose change that was collected. These details do not include donations, Arjitham and other sources of income. At the end, it is declared that the total amount has been credited to Srivari's Bhandaram.
- Matradana: The archakas (priests) who recited the slokas and Prabandhams are awarded rice, ginger and rations.

== Yearly Seva: Pushpa Pallaki ==
At the end of the financial year (falling in July), Anivara Asthanam is a procedure performed where yearly records are submitted to the Lord. Along with the previous year's accounts, insignia of office for all principal officers are submitted to the Lord and take them back to signify that the Lord finds them fit to hold their respective offices. New books are issued for recording financials of the next year. At the end of the event, thambulam is issued by the presiding priest to all principal officers signifying the Lord's pleasure with the temple officers.

The above ritual is done in ekanta (private) and is not open to the public. After the ritual, the utsava murti with his consorts (Malayappa swami) are taken in a palanquin decorated with flowers; this ceremony is open to public.
