= Varahaswamy Temple =

Hindu temple in Tirupati

Varahaswamy Temple, Tirumala
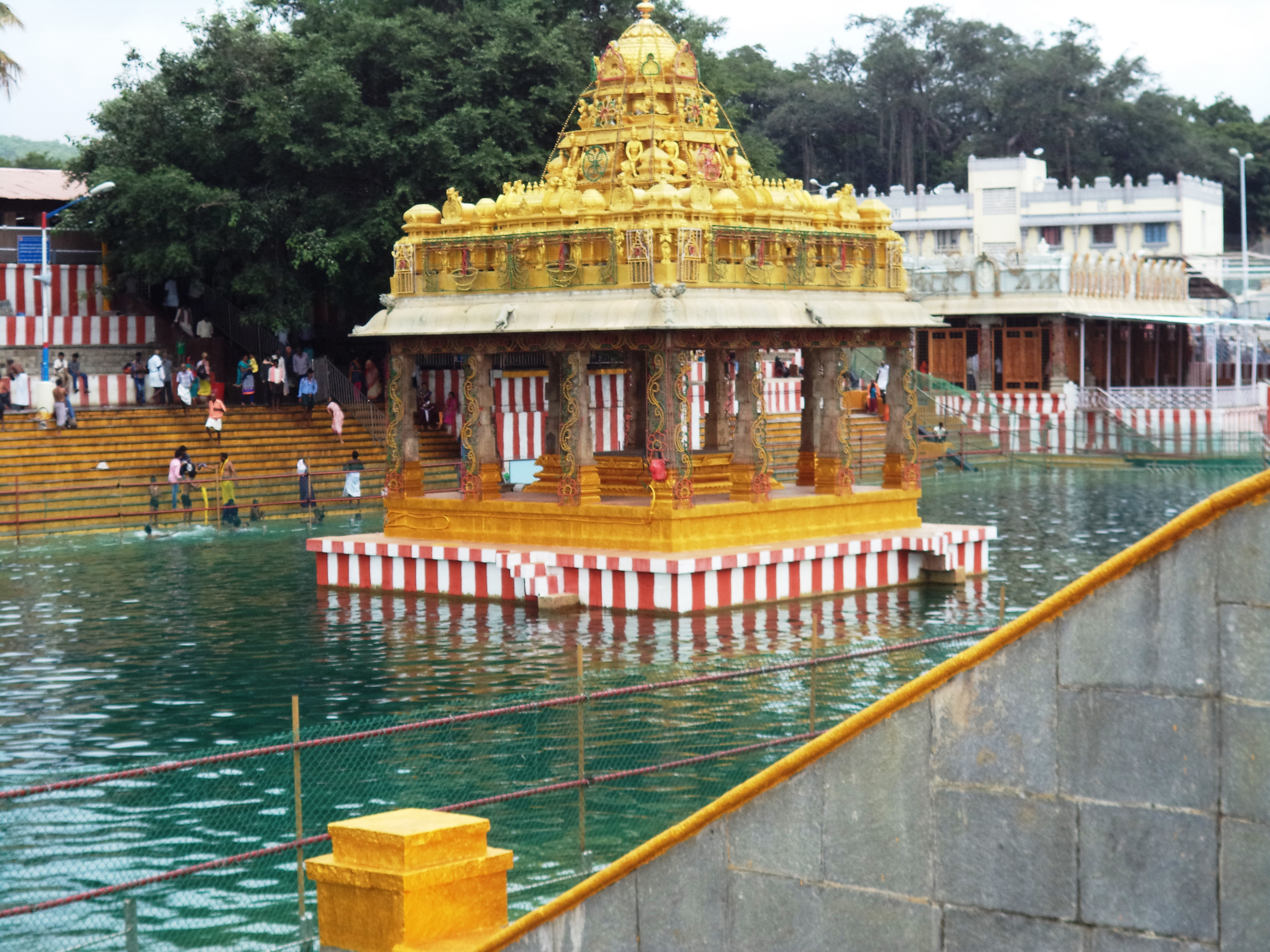
- View of Swami Pushkarni and Sri Bhu Varahaswami Temple (right corner), Tirumala

- Location in Andhra Pradesh

Religion
- Affiliation: Hinduism
- District: Tirupati district
- Deity: Varaha and Bhūmi
- Festivals: Varaha Jayanti, Vaikuntha Ekadashi,
- Governing body: Tirumala Tirupati Devasthanams

Location
- Location: Tirupati
- State: Andhra Pradesh
- Country: India
- Coordinates: 13°41′05.6″N 79°20′51.9″E

Architecture
- Type: Dravidian architecture

Specifications
- Temple: 1
- Elevation: 853 m (2,799 ft)

Website
- www.tirumala.org

The Sri Varahaswamy Temple, also called Bhu Varahaswamy Temple, is a Hindu temple dedicated to the god Varaha, situated at hill town of Tirumala in Tirupati, located in Tirupati district of Andhra Pradesh state, India. The temple is situated on the northern premises of Venkateswara Temple, Tirumala, on the north-west corner of Swami Pushkarini. This temple is believed to be older than the Venkateswara shrine.

== Religious significance ==
As per local Hindu legend, after saving the earth from the asura Hiranyaksha, Vishnu's boar avatar Varaha stayed on this hill on the northern bank of Swami Pushkarini. Hence Tirumala Hills is also referred to as Adi Varaha Kshetra. In the beginning of the present Yuga Kali Yuga, Varaha donated land to another form of Vishnu - Venkateswara on his request. As a gratitude, Lord Venkateswara offered the right of first bell, puja and naivedyam (food offering) to Varaha before they were offered to him. This is being followed as a tradition even today.

Devotees are prescribed to have darshana ("sight") of Varaha before Lord Venkateswara. It is believed that the pilgrimage to Tirumala will not be complete without having a darshana of Varaha.

== History ==
The temple was renovated by Pedda Tirumalacharya in the year 1535 CE.

== Administration ==
The temple is part of Tirumala Venkateswara Temple and is being administered by Tirumala Tirupati Devasthanams.

== Architecture ==
The rock temple is situated in the Northern bank of Swami Pushkarini and is accessed from North Mada street of Venkateswara Temple.

== Ritual practices ==
Daily rituals are held as per the Vaikhanasa Agama. The Chakrasnanam event during annual brahmotsavams, Vaikuntha Ekadashi, and Rathasaptami, are held in the mukha mandapa of Varahaswamy Temple. Varaha Jayanti is also celebrated.

== See also ==
- Hindu Temples in Tirupati
- List of temples under Tirumala Tirupati Devasthanams
