= Legend of Tirumala =

Legends associated with the Tirumala Venkateswara Temple

For one of the major Hindu denominations, the Venkateswara Temple, Tirumala at Tirupati in the Indian state of Andhra Pradesh is the most famous Vaishnavite temple in the world. The presiding deity of God Vishnu here is referred to as Venkateswara. There are many legends regarding this temple. The Sri Venkatachala Mahatyam is the most accepted legend among these, which provides the religious account of the history of the temple across various yugas. This place had also been mentioned in many Puranas, including the Skanda Purana, Varaha Purana, and Padma Purana.

The Tirumala hills, also known as Sheshachalam, are traditionally held to be the body of the cosmic serpent Ananta, also called Shesha, with their seven peaks symbolizing the serpent's seven heads upon which Vishnu is said to rest.

== Legend ==
According to the legend, In the beginning of present kalpa, the universe had undergone dissolution. Lord Vishnu, manifested as Śveta Varāha (the White Boar). He Rescued Bhudevi (Mother Earth) from the cosmic waters,defeated the demon Hiraṇyākṣa, Re-established the Earth for the new cycle of creation.This event gives the kalpa its name: Śveta-Varāha Kalpa. After rescuing the Earth, Varaha chose Venkaṭādri (Tirumala) as His divine abode. (Venkaṭācala Māhātmya) states that: Lord Varāha resides on the sacred hill. Vishnu manifested as Srinivasa there in Kali Yuga. Before living on the hill, Śrīnivāsa respectfully sought permission from Varaha, who granted Him residence. Because of this, pilgrims traditionally worship Ādi Varāha Swamy before having darśana of Lord Venkateswara.

== Early references ==
Sri Vaishnava tradition says that the Rig Veda verse X.155.1 makes an indirect reference to the temple. One such translation goes as:

The person, devoid of wealth and vision, is implored to go to the hill which burns up all evil (vikata for Venkata) and drives away all obstacles to peace and prosperity. The call of the rishi Sirimbitha has obviously not gone in vain.

The Sangam literature such as that of Silapadikaram and Satanar Manimekalai, dated between 500BC and 300AD, mentions Thiruvengadam (now named Tirupati) by the appellation "Nediyon Kunram" as the northernmost frontier of the Tamil kingdoms. In fact, a fairly detailed description of the deity is given in lines 41 to 51 of Book 11 of the Silapadikaram.

Thondaiman, ruler of Thondaimandalam (present day Kanchipuram and the surroundings), is believed to have first built the temple after visualizing Vishnu in his dream. He built the Gopuram and the Prakhara, and arranged for regular prayers to be conducted in the temple.

Later on, the Chola dynasty vastly improved the temple and gave rich endowments. The various scripts are still seen inscribed upon the temple prakara walls.

== Srivari Brahmotsavams ==
Srivari Brahmotsavam is the most important annual festival celebrated at Sri Venkateswara Temple. The event is conducted for nine days during Hindu Calendar month of Asvina which falls in between the English months September and October. As per the legend it is believed that Brahma will descend to the earth to conduct this festival and hence the festival got the name Brahmotsavams, meaning an utsavam (festival) performed by Brahma. Sri Venkateswara Sahasranamastotra has references to Brahma performing the festival. To resemble this, even now a small empty chariot will move ahead of the processions of Venkateswara's processional deity Malayappa.
