= Bruce's Code =

Bruce's Code is a set of rules for the management and administration of temples of Tirumala and Tirupati including the servants, enacted by East India Company in 1821 AD.

These were the well-defined rules formulated as a code having 42 provisions to ease the administration of temples of Tirumala and Tirupati on the basis of customs and previous usages without interfering in the day-to-day affairs.

== Purpose ==
The objective of the British in taking over Tirupati temples was to generate fixed revenue to the Circar (government) by organising the income of the temple to prevent misappropriation and mismanagement of temple funds through systematic administration and to justify the transfer of the funds to the British coffers for their expenditure.

== History ==
After the fall of Hindu empires by 18th century AD, the temples of Tirumala and Tirupati came under the Muslim rulers during the 18th century AD. With the arrival of British, the management of temples were transferred from Nawabs of Arcot to East India Company in 1801 AD.

During the reign of the Nawabs of Arcot, the net income of the temple was appreciated by the secular authorities for their own functioning by depriving the temple lands from the non-Hindu rulers either through self-aggrandizement or through alienation of certain hereditary servants of the temple in order to ensure permanency of service in the temple. Consequent to the death of Chanda Shahib, the then Nawab of Arcot, British's installed Muhammed Ali Khan Wallajah as Nawab of Arcot serving as vassal of the British. Consequently, Muhammed Ali Khan Wallajah along with his successors ran into enormous debts to British. Nawabs of Arcot assigned the revenues of the temples to the East India Company to enable them recoup its expenditure incurred as a loan to the Nawab of Arcot, in spite of temple along with Paragana of Tirupati was held as property of Nawabs of Arcot nominally.

After the establishment of Board of Revenue at Fort St.George in 1789, East India Company took over the management of temple from Nawabs of Arcot to generate fixed revenue per annum to the circar by organising the income of the temple. By 1801 AD, the British East India Company dispossessed the Nawabs of Arcot, annexed Arcot into their domain and whereby assumed the direct administration of the Tirupati temples for the sake of income of the temple.

In 1803, the then Collector of Chittoor, within which Tirupati district is situated had sent a report to the board of revenues showing the full account of the institution, together with schedules, pujas, expenses, and extent of lands etc., known as "Statton's Report" on the tirupati Pagoda. These reports though small are in the same lines as the earliest report submitted to the British government on Jagannath Temple by "Grome" and "Garrett". British rulers used "Statton's Report" to control and manage the institution till a set of rules for the management of the temple and the servants, were framed in 1821 A.D known as "Bruce's Code".

Between 1805-16, due to many instances and complaints about misappropriation and mismanagement of Tirumala and Tirupati temple funds were brought to the notice of board, the British East India Company passed the Regulation VII of 1817 to check the abuses. Through the regulation provided, the duty of the board was only "general superintendence and not detailed management". However, the Board interfered in almost all aspects of the administration of the Tirumala and Tirupati temple. Bruce, the then Commissioner of the Chittoor district formulated a Code containing 42 provisions, known as "Bruce's code" for the guidance of the Tirumala and Tirupati temple administration.

This interference continued till the "Court of Directors" in England strongly resented the participation of the Company's officers and men in the idolatry conducted in Hindu temples by reason of its management of these religious institutions and ordered its relinquishment of their administration of religious endowments. It came into effect in 1842-43 AD, in the early years of the reign of Queen Victoria.
