= Ananda Nilayam =

Temple sanctutary in Tirumala, India

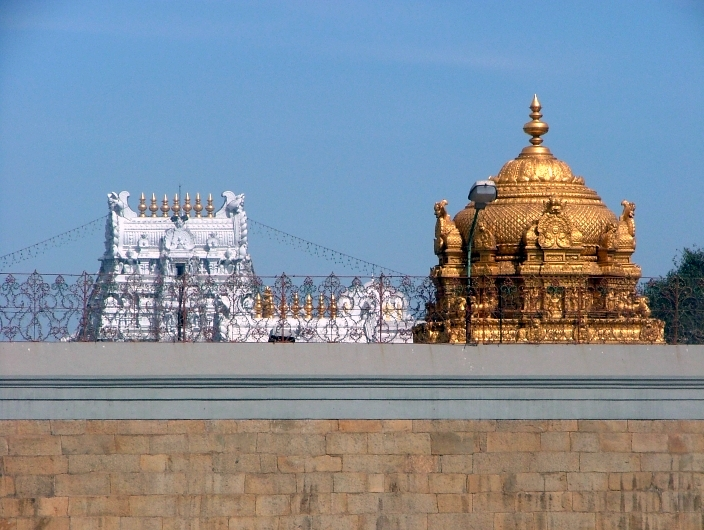
Ananda Nilayam: the Golden Gopuram of Tirumala Temple along with the inner and outer Gopuram

Ananda Nilayam (Abode of Happiness) is the gold-plated gopuram atop the inner sanctum of the Tirumala Venkateswara Temple. In Vaishnavism, gopurams of the inner sanctum are listed below:

- Sri Ranganathaswamy Temple (Srirangam), Srirangam: Pranavaakaara Vimanam (after its shape like Pranava, the sacred Om)
- Tirumala Venkateswara Temple, Tirumala: Ananda Nilayam
- Varadharaja Perumal Temple, Kanchipuram: Punyakoti Vimanam

== Architecture ==
Vimana is the style of architecture that Hindu temples followed. The Ananda Nilaya vimanam is a three-tiered canopy.

== Construction ==
=== Initial construction ===
The first mention of Vimana is from the renovation work of the temple between the 12th and 13th century AD when a second wall was constructed around the sanctum sanctorum enclosing the first wall to support the weight of the vimana. The Pandyan king Jatavarman Sundara Pandyan gold-plated the roof and donated the gilded Kalasam. Viranarasingaraya, a Pallava-allied king, performed thulabhara (weighing oneself) against gold; his weight in gold was used to make the gold-plated copper sheets to cover the Vimana. This phase of construction is usually agreed as the fourth phase of Tirumala temple construction out of seven.

=== 1950s and 1960s renovation ===
In the 1950s, it was discovered that the gold was getting old and parts of the roof inside were caving into the Sanctum Sanctorum. The TTD decided to replace the aging metal and fix the roof.

All the gold was removed and painstakingly replaced; the damaged levels of the roof below were fixed with cement and extra strength metal grouting reinforcement. During this period in the mid-1960s, no worship could be performed in the Sanctum Sanctorum and so the "power" of the chief deity was shifted into a temporary idol carved and placed elsewhere in the temple. All the worship was performed in this new "Bala Aalaya" (Child Temple).

It took five years for the carpenters and builders to get dies of the nooks and crannies of the roof and finally copper plates were cast into those shapes. Long nails of the 10th century AD were removed and replaced with solid cement and metal grouting using 20th century construction techniques. The copper plates were then installed and fixed in place. Fine "Aparanji" (the best quality) gold was chiseled into plates and riveted onto the copper plates.

A grand ceremony of sanctifying the new grand, golden Ananda Nilaya Vimanam took place in 1964 with "Ashta Bandhana Maha Samprokshanam". The ceremony has been repeated ever since once every 12 years to undertake repairs in the temple.

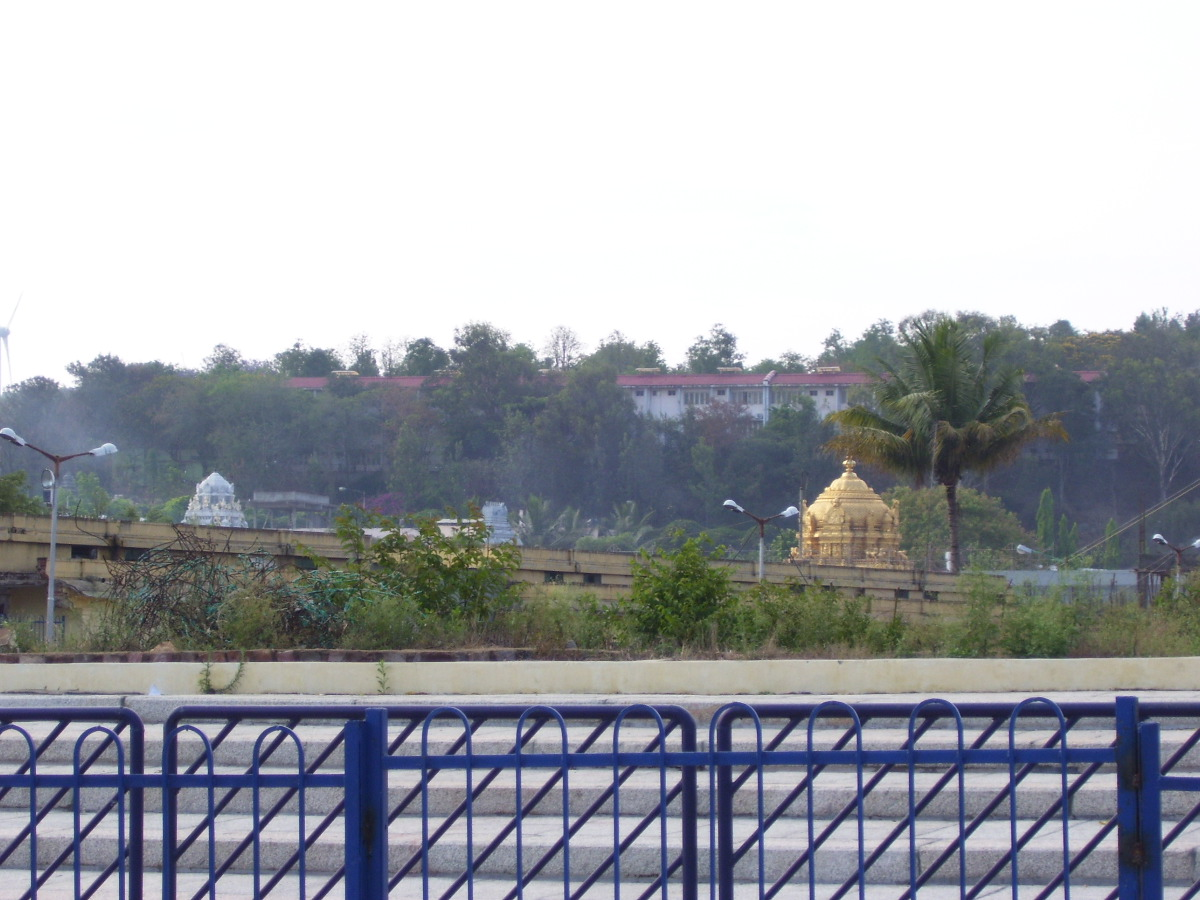
Golden Vimana of Tirumala Temple

=== Recent activities ===
In 2004, there were discussions of replacing the gold-plated copper sheets with sheets of gold itself. No work is known to have started on the reconstruction. In 2006, the sheets were given new polish as part of the Ashta Bandhana Maha Samprokshanam ceremony along with repairs to other sub-temples in the complex.

== Vimana Venkateswaraswamy ==
Saint Vyasa Teertha, who lived here in the 16th century, was said to have attained moksha by steadfastly worshiping and meditating on the little image of Lord Venkateswara on the northeastern corner of the Ananda Nilaya Vimanam. That is why special significance is given to the Vimana Venkateswara. The Vimana Venkateswara now is bedecked in special silver and gold over the Vimanam. Hundreds of devotees are seen praying to the Vimana Venkateswara daily inside the temple.
