= Venkateswara Temple, Tirumala =

Hindu temple in Andhra Pradesh, India

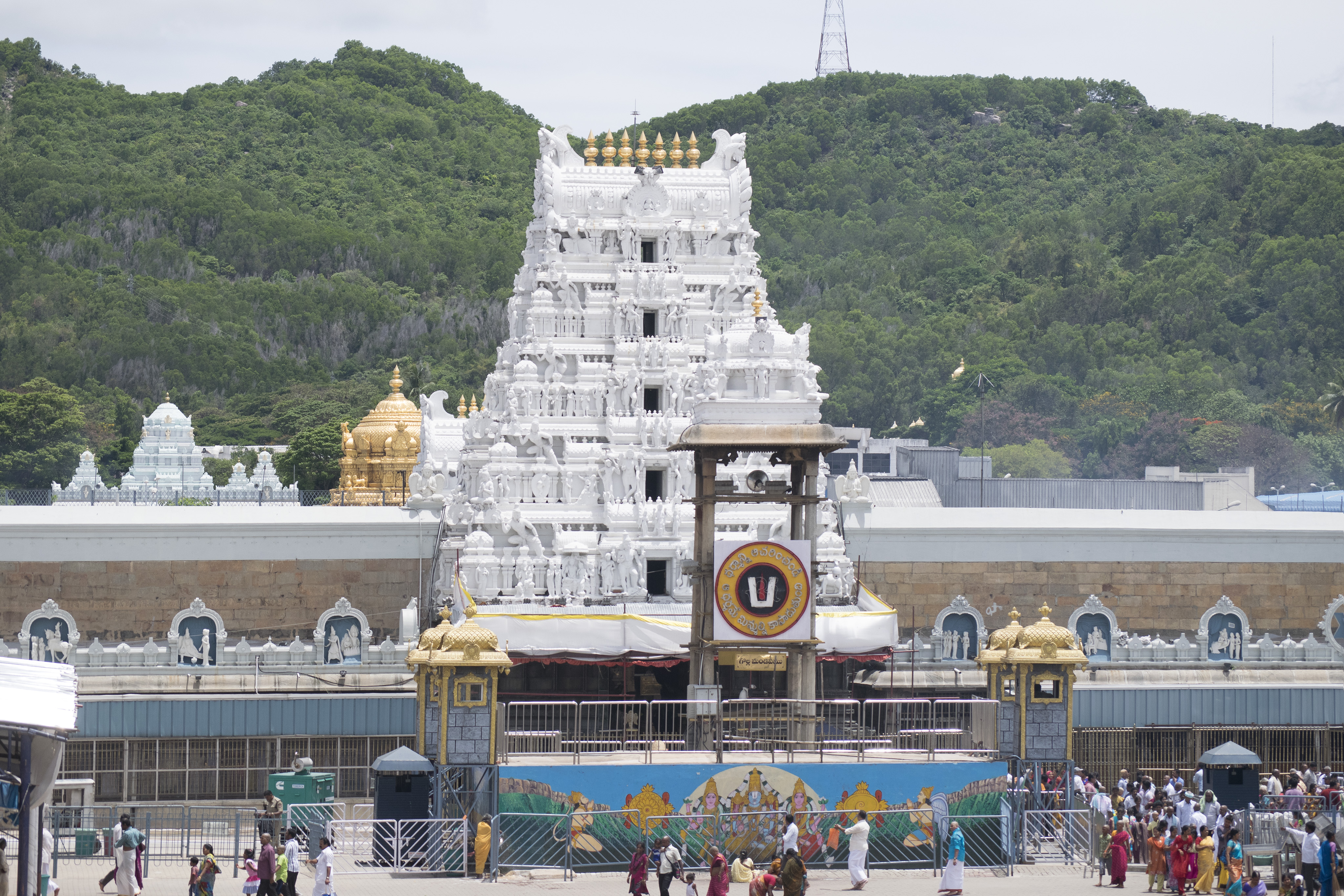

- Location in Andhra Pradesh

Religion
- Affiliation: Hinduism
- District: Tirupati
- Deity: Venkateswara
- Festivals: Srivari Brahmotsavam, Vaikunta Ekadashi, Ratha Saptami
- Governing body: Tirumala Tirupati Devasthanams

Location
- Location: Tirumala, Tirupati
- State: Andhra Pradesh
- Country: India
- Interactive map of Venkateswara Temple, Tirumala
- Coordinates: 13°40′59.7″N 79°20′49.9″E

Architecture
- Type: Dravidian architecture
- Creator: Tondaiman Ilandiraiyan; Veera Narasingadeva Krishnadevaraya; Veera Rakshasa Krishnadevaraya; Ranganatharaya

Specifications
- Temple: 1
- Inscriptions: Tamil, Telugu, Kannada, Sanskrit,
- Elevation: 853 m (2,799 ft)

Website
- www.tirumala.org

The Venkateswara Swami Temple—also known as Tirumala Temple, Tirupati Temple and Tirupati Balaji Temple—is a Hindu temple located in the hills of Tirumala, within Tirupati Urban Mandal, Tirupati district, Andhra Pradesh, India. The temple is dedicated to Venkateswara, a form of Vishnu, who is believed to have appeared on earth to save mankind from trials and troubles of Kali Yuga. Hence the site is also called Kaliyuga Vaikuntha and the deity is known as Kaliyuga Prathyaksha Daivam. Venkateswara is additionally known as Balaji, Govinda, and Srinivasa. The temple is administered by the Tirumala Tirupati Devasthanams (TTD), an autonomous body under the control of the Government of Andhra Pradesh. The head of TTD is appointed by Andhra Pradesh Government.

Tirumala Hills, which are part of Seshachalam Hills range, rise to approximately 980 metres (3,220 ft) above sea level and comprise seven peaks. Per local tradition, the seven peaks represent the seven heads of Adisesha. The temple lies on the seventh peak—Venkatadri, on the southern banks of Sri Swami Pushkarini, a holy water tank. Hence the temple is also referred to as "Temple of Seven Hills". Tirumala town covers an area of about 10.33 sq mi (26.75 km^{2}).

The Venkateswara temple at Tirumala is traditionally attributed to the Tondaiman rulers, with later expansions and reforms carried out under the Cholas, Pandyas and Vijayanagar dynasties. The temple, built in Dravidian architecture style, is believed to be developed over a period of time starting from 300 CE. The Garbhagriha (sanctum sanctorum) known as Ananda Nilayam, houses the presiding deity Venkateswara, who stands facing east. The temple follows Vaikhanasa Agama tradition of worship. The temple is one of the eight Vishnu Swayambhu (self-manifested) Kshetras and is one of the 108 Divya Desam temples mentioned in the Naalayira Divya Prabandham. The temple premises include two modern queue complexes for managing pilgrim crowds, the Tarigonda Vengamamba Annaprasadam Complex that provides free meals, dedicated facilities for hair tonsure and multiple lodging sites for pilgrims. The temple is one of the richest Hindu temples in the world in terms of donations received and wealth.

There are several legends associated with the manifestation of the deity in Tirumala. According to one legend, the temple has a murti of Venkateswara, is “Nitya-daiva-kalpa” — the eternal deity which shall remain on Venkatachala (Tirumala) until the entire duration of the present Kalpa.

The temple is one of the world's most visited religious sites, attracts around 24 million devotees annually. The average daily pilgrim footfall is above 60,000 devotees, and the number crosses one lakh devotees during the annual Brahmotsavams, Vaikunta Ekadasi, and other festival and holiday seasons.

== Temple legend ==
The Tirumala hills, also known as Sheshachalam, are traditionally believed to represent the body of the cosmic serpent Ananta, also called Shesha, with their seven peaks symbolizing the serpent's seven heads upon which Vishnu is said to rest.

Three interconnected legends from the Puranas are traditionally cited to explain the presence of Venkateswara at this site.

According to Puranic tradition, Tirumala became Vishnu's earthly home at the onset of the Kali Age. Wishing to remain close to his worshippers during this era, Vishnu consulted the sage Narada about a suitable location. Narada directed him to the banks of the Svarnamukhi River in southern India. The cosmic serpent Shesha transformed into the surrounding hills, known as Sheshachalam. Vishnu descended to the summit in the form of Venkateswara, and the site has since been renowned as Tirupati.

The Varaha Purana and Skanda Purana connect the site with Vishnu's boar incarnation, Varaha. In this account, Varaha plunged into the primordial ocean to recover the Earth, personified as the goddess Prithivi, who had sunk beneath the waters. After lifting her to safety, Varaha set her down upon the hills of Shesha and remained there with her, and the site took the name Varaha Kshetra. His fearsome boar form troubled Brahma, who petitioned him to assume a gentler appearance, and Varaha then manifested as Venkateswara. A related tradition holds that after the rescue, Garuda, Vishnu's eagle-mount, was sent to Vaikuntha to fetch a sacred hill that became holy Tirumala, and on its summit established the tank known as Varaha Pushkarini, the Lotus Pool.

The Vaishnava mahatmyas of the Puranas trace the presence of Venkateswara at Sheshachalam to a conflict involving the sage Bhrigu. Tasked with identifying which of the great gods was most deserving of a yajna sacrifice, Bhrigu visited each in turn. He found Brahma absorbed with the goddess Sarasvati and Shiva occupied with Parvati. At Vaikuntha, he found Vishnu asleep and struck him on the chest with his foot. Vishnu, rather than taking offense, attended to the sage's foot in concern. Lakshmi, however, was deeply offended. Lakshmi considered the chest her own place, and having it struck was an indignity she could not accept. She departed Vaikuntha in anger. Vishnu followed, wandering across the subcontinent through the Himalayan foothills, along the Ganga, and across the Vindhya hills and southern plains. On reaching Sheshachalam, the hills formed by his cosmic serpent Shesha, he found the place to be like Vaikuntha itself and settled there. In the Kali Age, Lakshmi was reborn as Padmavati, a child discovered when a field was plowed, and she became united with Vishnu in his form as Venkateswara.

== History of the temple ==
=== Mention in Cilappatikaram ===
The temple is mentioned in Cilappatikaram, one of the Five Great Epics of Tamil literature. In the narrative, when Kovalan meets a Brahmin, who asks him where he has come from and why he has arrived there, to which the Brahmin replies, "I came to satisfy my heart's desire, to see with my own eyes the glory of Vishnu, whom many worship with prayer as He reposes with Lakshmi in His chest, on the couch of the thousand hooded Serpent, in the temple in island jutting out on the widening waves of the Kaveri, even as the blue clouds repose supine on the slopes of the lofty golden mountain (Meru)." This line mentions Srirangam and next he mentions Tirumala as follows, "I also came to see the beauty of the red-eyed Lord, holding in His beautiful lotus-hands the discus which is death to His enemies, and also the milk white conch (to see Him) wearing a garland of tender flowers on His chest, and draped in golden flowers and dwelling on the topmost crest of the tall and lofty hill named Venkatam with innumerable waterfalls, standing like a cloud in its natural hue, adorned with a rainbow and attired with lightning, in the midst of a place both sides of which are illumined by the spreading rays of the sun and the moon."

=== Medieval history ===
The first recorded endowment was made by Pallava queen Samavai in the year 966 CE. She donated many jewels and two parcels of land (one 10 acres and other 13 acres) and ordered use of the revenues generated from that land for the celebration of major festivals in the temple. The Pallava dynasty (9th century), the Chola dynasty (10th century), Reddi Kingdom (12th and 13th centuries) and Vijayanagara pradhans (14th and 15th centuries) were committed devotees of Venkateswara. The temple gained most of its current wealth and size under the Vijayanagara Empire, present-day Karnataka state, with the donation of diamonds and gold. In the 16th century, Vijayanagara Emperor Krishnadevaraya was a frequent donor and visitor to the temple. His donations of gold and jewels enabled the Ananda Nilayam (inner shrine) roofing to be gilded. On 2 January 1517, Krishnadevaraya installed his own statue in the temple.

After the decline of Vijayanagara Empire, rulers from states such as the Kingdom of Mysore and the Gadwal Samsthanam worshipped as pilgrims and donated ornaments and valuables to the temple. Maratha general Raghoji I Bhonsle set up a permanent administration for the conduct of worship in the temple. He donated valuable jewels to the Lord which are still preserved in a box named after him. Between 1320 CE and 1369 CE, idols of Ranganathaswamy Temple, Srirangam were brought to this temple for safe keeping.

=== Ramanujacharya's visits ===
In the 11th and 12th centuries, Ramanujacharya visited Tirupati three times. During his first visit, he spent a year with his uncle, Tirumalai Nambi, learning the esoteric meaning of the Ramayana. His second visit was to settle a dispute that had arisen between the Saivites and Vaishnavites regarding the nature of the image set up in the Tirumala temple. During the last visit, at the advanced old age of 102 years, the Acharya installed the image of Govindaraja and laid the foundations of the present-day town of Tirupati. Ramanuja streamlined the rituals at the Tirumala temple according to Vaikhanasa Agama tradition and introduced the recitation of Naalayira Divya Prabandham. He also set up Tirupati Jeeyar Mutt in 1119 AD in consultation with Tirumalai Ananthalwan to institutionalise service to the deity and supervise the temple rituals. To this day, the Jeeyars ensure that the rituals ordained by Ramanuja are observed.

=== Modern history ===
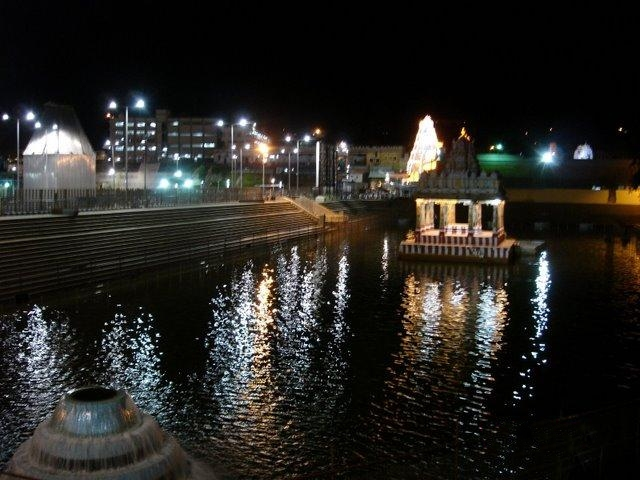
Swami Pushkarni of Tirumala

After the fall of Vijayanagara Empire, the temple came under the control of Golconda in July 1656. It was subsequently administered for a brief period by the French and later by Nawab of Carnatic until 1801 CE. With the arrival of the British in the early 19th century, the management of the temple passed to the East India Company, which accorded special status to the temple and refrained from interfering in its activities. In 1817, the Madras government enacted Regulation VII, transferring oversight of the temple to the Board of Revenue through the Collector of North Arcot District. In 1821, Bruce, the East India company commissioner for the Chittoor district, formulated rules for the management of Temple, later known as Bruce's Code. The 7th Nizam of Hyderabad, Mir Osman Ali Khan made annual donations of ₹8,000 to the temple.

In 1843, the East India Company transferred the administration of the temple, along with other Temples in Tirupati, to the Mahants of Hathiramji Muth, who acted as Vicaranakartas. The temple remained under the Mahants' control for six generations until 1933, when Tirumala Tirupati Devasthanams (TTD) was established under the TTD Act of 1933. The Act of 1933 was later superseded by the Madras Hindu Religious and Charitable Endowment Act of 1951. In 1966, the temple was placed under the direct control of the Andhra Pradesh State Endowments Department, through the Andhra Pradesh Charitable and Hindu Religious Institutions and Endowments Act. This arrangement was reversed in 1979 with the enactment of the new Tirumala Tirupati Devasthanams Act, which vested temple administration in a committee consisting of an Executive Officer, a Chairman and two other members nominated by the Government of Andhra Pradesh. The temple continues to be administered by the Tirumala Tirupati Devasthanams which is under the control of Andhra Pradesh Government. The head of TTD is appointed by Andhra Pradesh Government, and the revenue from the shrine is utilized by Andhra Pradesh government.

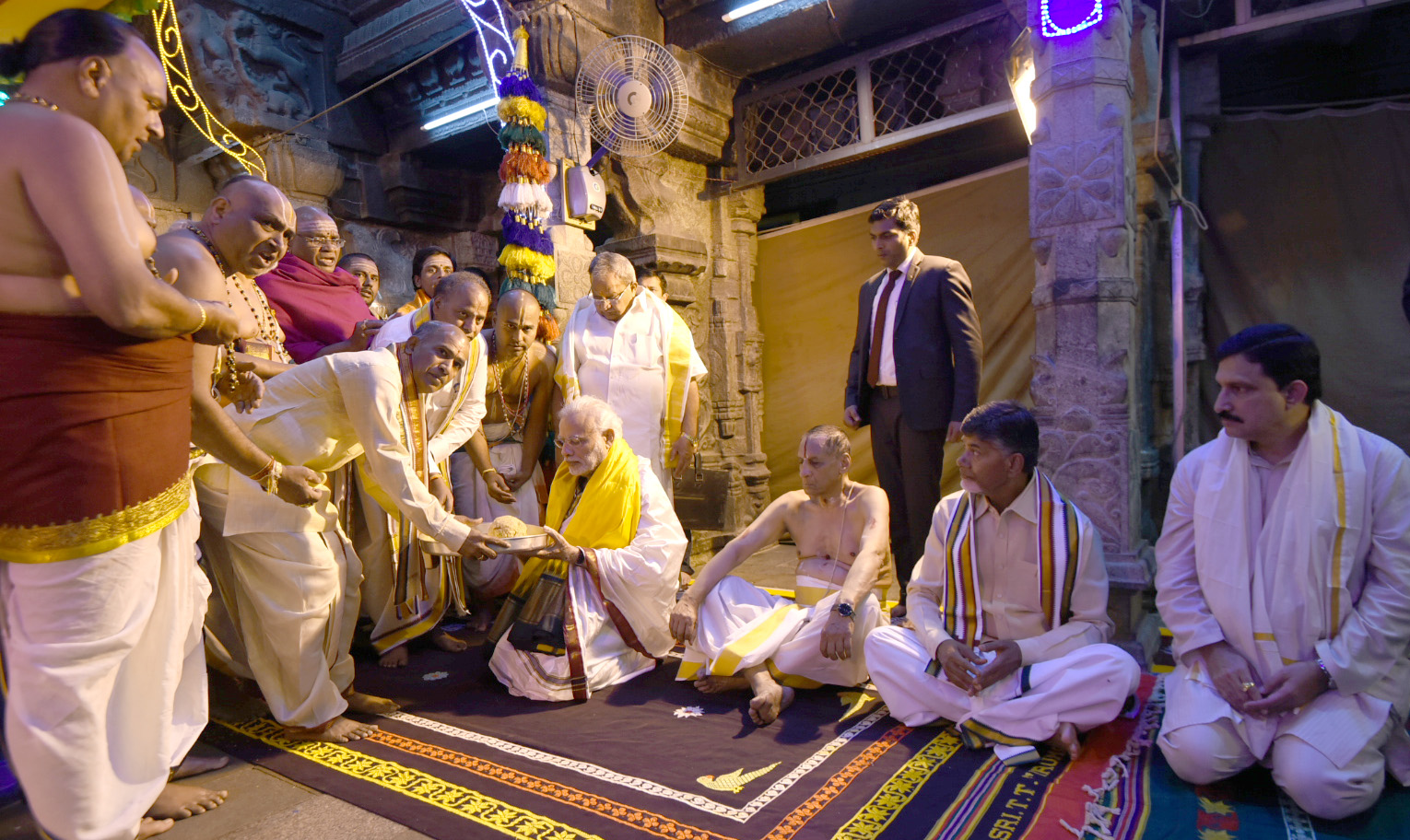
Indian Prime Minister Narendra Modi pays obeisance at Tirumala Temple

The temple bears as many as 640 inscriptions in Kannada, Sanskrit, Tamil, Telugu languages. There is a unique collection of about 3000 copper plates on which the Telugu Sankirtanas of Tallapaka Annamacharya and his descendants are inscribed. This collection forms a valuable source of material for a historical linguist in Telugu apart from its importance to musicologists.

== Temple administration ==
Tirumala Tirupati Devasthanams (TTD) is the trust board which oversees and manages the operations of Tirumala Venkateswara Temple. It is operated by a board of trustees that has increased in size from five (1951) to eighteen (2015) through the adoption of Acts. The daily operation and management of TTD is the responsibility of an executive officer, who is appointed by the Government of Andhra Pradesh.

Based on analysis of data during Jan 2022 – Feb 2024, maximum average daily visitors to Tirumala Venkateswara temple is about 87,000. The annual budget, estimated at ₹25301 million for the financial year 2015–16, runs charitable trusts whose funds are derived from the budget and donations from the devotees. The annual income is estimated at ₹10000 million in 2008. Most of its income is derived from the donations in SriVari Hundi. Devotees donate to the TTD, which runs into millions of rupees. TTD, the organisation running the welfare of the temple, runs various charitable trusts, whose funds are derived from the budget and donations from the devotees.

== Architecture ==
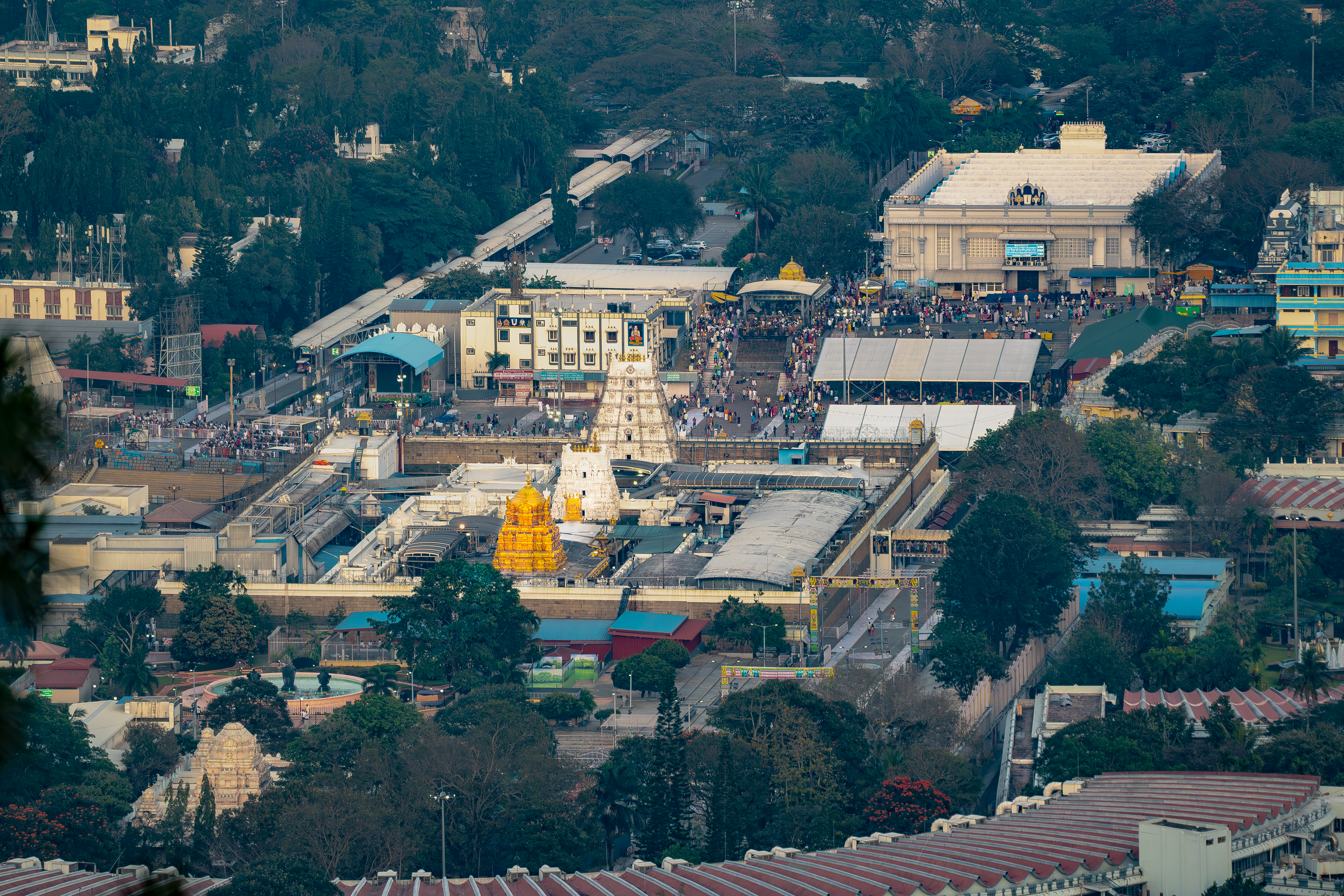
Tirumala Temple and Vaikuntam Queue Complex (semicircular building in the foreground) as seen from Srivari Padalu on Narayanagiri hill

=== Dvarams and Prakarams ===
There are three dvarams (entrances) which lead to the garbhagriha from outside.

==== Mahadvaram ====
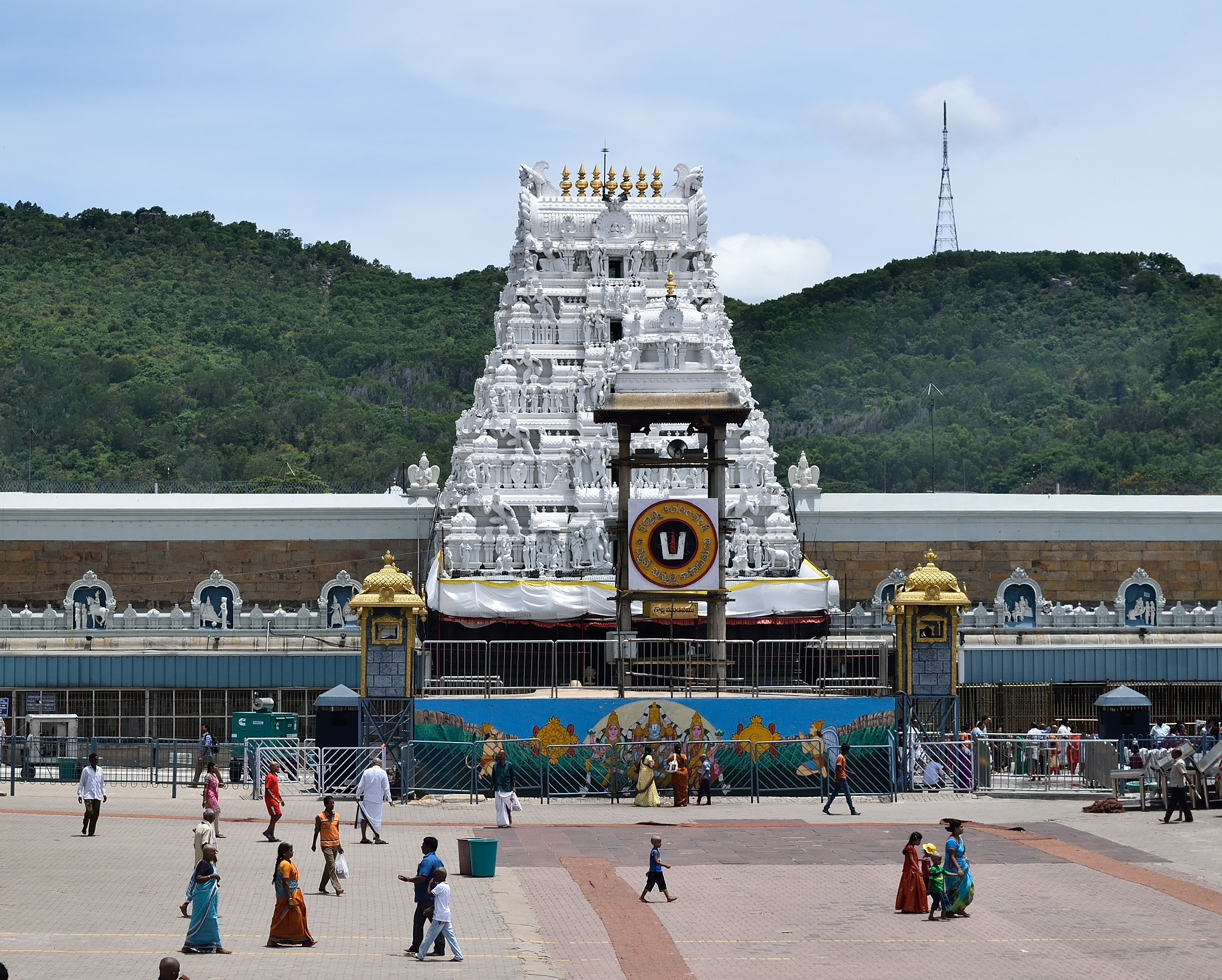
Maha Dwaram of Sri Venkateswara Temple with Five storied Gopuram over it encircled by Mahaprakaram

The Maha Dwaram is the main entrance to the temple and is also known as 'Padikavali', 'Simhadvaram,' or 'Outer Gopuram'. It provides access from outside the temple to the Sampangi Pradakshinam, and is separated from it by an outer compound wall (Maha Prakaram). The tower stands at the height of 50 ft (15 m). On either side of the entrance stand two panchaloha statues of Sankanidhi and Padmanidhi, who are traditionally regarded as the guardians of the Navanidhi, the nine treasures of Venkateswara.

==== Venḍi Vākili ====
Venḍi Vākili, which means "silver entrance" in Telugu, is the second entrance of the temple. It leads to the Vimana Pradakshinam and is also known as 'Nadimipadikavali'. The name of this entrance comes from the silver plating on the doors. An inner compound wall separates the Sampangi Pradakshinam and Vimana Pradakshinam. A three storied gopuram was built over this entrance with seven kalisams during the twelfth and thirteenth centuries.

==== Baṁgāru Vākili ====
The Baṁgāru Vākili, or 'Golden Entrance,' is accessible from the Tirumamani Mandapam, and leads to the inner sanctum sanctorum. There are two tall copper images of the dwarapalakas, Jaya and Vijaya on either side of the door. The door is covered with gilt plates depicting the avatars of Vishnu. The doorway is directly in line with the Padi Kavali and the Vendi Vakili. It admits pilgrims to the Snapana Mandapam. Suprabhatam is sung in front of this door.

=== Pradakshinas ===
The temple is surrounded by 3 concentric compound walls (or prakaram). Pradakshinas are the spaces enclosed between them which are used for circumambulation rituals.

==== Sampangi Pradakshina ====
The Sampangi Pradakshina is the primary circumambulation walkway within the temple complex. It is named after Magnolia champaca flowers, called Sampangi in Telugu, which were grown in the area. The mandapas situated in the Pradakshina are:

- Pratima Mandapam: An 11m^{2} mandapa with two wings directly attached to either side of the entrance and a pathway in the middle. Named so because the bronze pratimas (statues) of Vijayanagar Emperor Krishnadevaraya, his consorts Tirumaladevi and Chinnadevi, and others.
- Ranga Mandapam: Situated in the south-east corner to the right of the entrance. It is also called the Ranganayakula mandapa, as it is where the utsava-murti of Lord Ranganathaswamy of Srirangam was kept when Srirangam was occupied by Malik Kafur. Architecturally and sculpturally, it seems to belong to the later mature Vijayanagar period.
- Tirumalaraya Mandapam: Also known as the Anna Unjal mandapa. Constructed in two phases — the inner higher platform is traditionally attributed to Vijayanagar Emperor Saluva Narsimha Deva Raya in 1473 CE, whereas the front was added on by later Vijayanagar kings in the last quarter of the 16th century. Narsimha Deva is said to have installed it for celebrating the Anna Unjal Tirunal festival he instituted.
- Saluva Narasimha Mandapams: Four small mandapams at four corners of the pradakshina, also erected by Narsimha Deva.
- Aina Mahal: Translated as the 'Palace of Mirrors', on the north side of Tirumalaraya Mandapam. It consists of an open mandapa in the front and a shrine behind it consisting of an antarala and garbhagriha, which has large mirrors that reflect images in an infinite series. It is here that Malayappa Swami (the processional idol of the deity) holds his annual audience upon the commencement of the Brahmotsavam.
- Dhvajasthamba Mandapam: Built around the temple's dhvajasthamba (flagstaff) and balipitta (altars for placing offerings). Situated right in front of the Venḍi Vākili.

Additionally, various ugrams (storerooms) are located across the corridor.

==== Vimana Pradakshina ====
The Venḍi Vākili leads to the Vimana Pradakshina. It is the pathway that circumambulates the Sanctum Sanctorum. The Angapradakshina Seva is performed in this area; hence, this path is also referred to as the Angapradakshina Margam.

Other rooms along the path include:

- Potu: The main temple kitchen. There is a small shrine inside enclosed to the doorway dedicated to Vakuladevi, who is called 'Pottu Amma' or 'Madapulli Nachiar'.
- Bangaru Bavi: Translated as 'golden well'. Facing the potu and adjoining the corridor, from which all the water required for the temple and the kitchen is drawn through stone pipes.
- Kalyana Mandapam: On the south-west corner of the pradakshina. At its western end is situated a small black granite shrine, behind which is a raised portion which is the temple's yagashala.
- Ankurarpana Mandapam
- Rooms for Nanalu (coins) and Notlu (paper notes) for Parkamani
- Chandanapu Ara: The almirah of sandal paste
- The Cell of Records
- Shrine for Sri Ramanuja
- Sangita Samgraham: Also called the Talapakamara, it is a small room which houses copper plates upon which are engraved the devotional songs of Talapakka Annamacharaya, his son Pedda Tirumalacharaya and grandson Chinna Tirumalacharaya.
- Storage rooms for the Lord's procession vehicles.
- The Lord's Hundi

Devotees also have darshan of Vimana Venkateswara Swamy, who resides on Ananda Nilayam, from the Sampangi Pradakshinam.

All the small temples along this pathway are collectively known as ‘Chuttu Gullu’—the sub-shrines that encircle the main shrine.

=== Main Shrine ===
==== Tirumamani Mandapam ====
The first mandapam of the main shrine is an open sixteen-pillared hall whose left and right walls are divided into three sections, with the central section being wider than the others. Two large inscribed temple bells are located in the south-west corner, giving the mandapam the name Tirumamani. The hall is the site where Koluvu Srinivasa holds daily audience following the Tomala Seva, during which garlands and tulsi leaves are offered to the deity. Malayappa Swami is also seated here in the afternoon during the commencement of the Brahmotsavam. The mandapam was constructed in 1417 CE by Mallanna, who is also known as Madhavadasa, a chief of Chandragiri near Tirupati.

A shrine dedicated to Garuda is located at the rear of the mandapa, to the right of the entrance, directly facing the Bamgaru Vakili. Supposedly constructed around 1417 after the completion of Tirumamani Mandapam, the shrine houses a standing statue of Garuda.

==== Snapana Mandapam ====
Also called tiruvilankovil, it is the mandapa encountered right after passing the Bangaru Vakili. It has four central pillars with bas reliefs carved in the Vijayanagar style. The front part of the mandapa was converted into two rooms, one on either side.

==== Garbhagriha ====
The Garbhagriha or sanctum sanctorum, which used to be called the 'Koyil Alwar' in old times, is where the Mula Beram (Main Idol) of Lord Venkateswara is placed. This 8-ft idol is believed to be self-manifested. Tradition holds that no known sculptors were capable of producing such an idol, and no person was known to have installed the idol in the temple.

The garbhagriha is almost a square shaped structure 12 ft^{2} in area. Its walls as well as the Sayana mandapa's walls are double walls built one behind another. The walls of the garbhagriha as they exist at present are made of cut stones and may belong to the 8th or 9th century CE. The temple type consisting of a garbhagriha with a mukha mandapa and pradakshina got established in South India by about 8th century CE. The outer face of the outer wall has some inscriptions dating from 966–1013 CE.

==== Ananda Nilayam ====
The Ananda Nilayam is a gold-plated three-storey vimanam (a structure constructed over the garbhagriha), under which the deity stands directly beneath. According to the temple's inscriptions, the gold plating was installed during renovations of the temple in c.13th century C.E., and a gold-plated kalasha was installed on the vimana by Pandya king Jatavarman Sundara I in c. 1262. It was later renovated in the 1950s and 60s.

=== Pushkarni ===
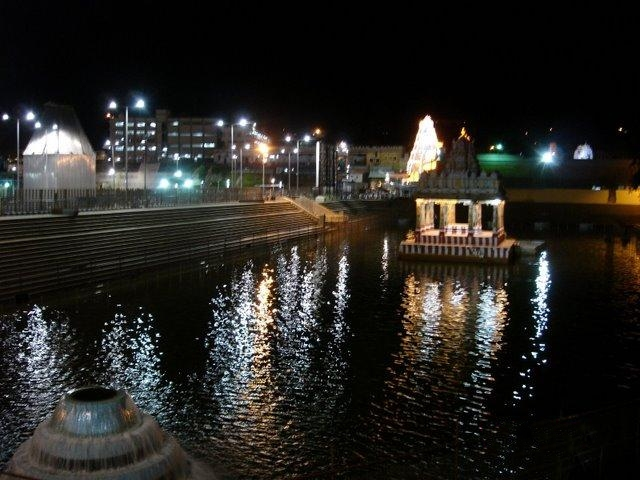
Swami Pushkarni during night with Mandapam at its centre and Venkateswara Temple in the background

Swami Pushkarni is the temple pond situated on the northern side of the main shrine. The pond covers over 1.5 acres, and is regarded as sacred and is believed to have been brought by Garuda from Vaikuntha to Tirumala Hills. A mandapam, which was constructed in 1468 by Saluva King Narasimha Raya, once stood in the center of the pond. A harathi is offered to the Pushkarni in the evening by the temple priests. The Sri Venkateswara Annual Theppotsavam (Float festival) is held in this pond every year, during which the processional deities of the temple are taken on a float across the water. Chakrasnanam, a ceremonial bath to Chakrathalwar, Malayappa and his concerts, is performed here on the final day of Srivari Brahmotsavams.

=== Akhilandam ===
Akhilandam, also known as Akhandam, is the area in front of the main temple where large lamps are installed. Devotees offer karpuram (camphor) here, and the resulting flame is maintained continuously. Next to the lamps are two metal stands, where devotees break coconuts as offerings after darshan. From Akhilandam, one can have a complete view of the temple.

== Deities in the temple ==
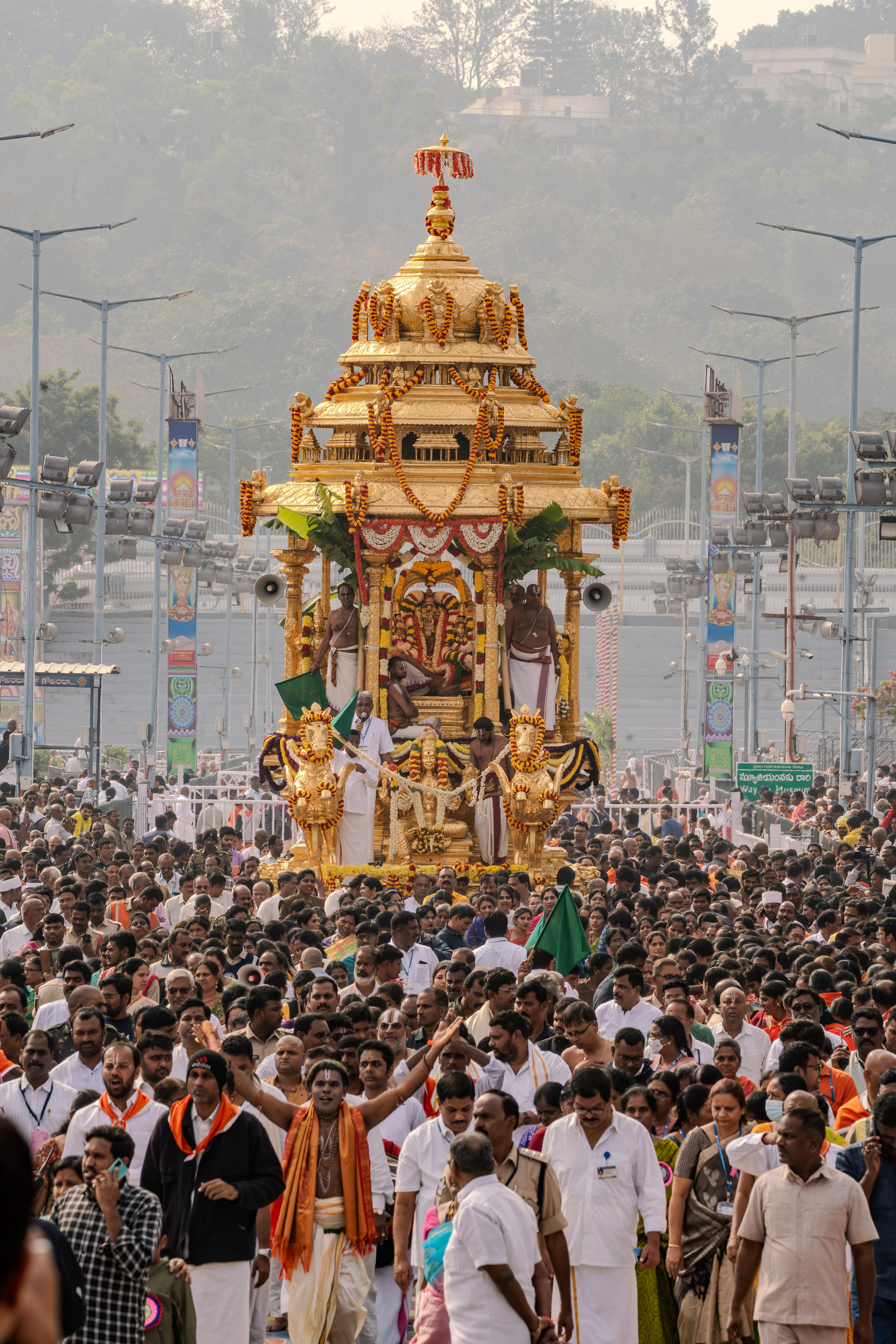
Deity in procession at the temple

Venkateswara, a form of Vishnu is the presiding deity of the temple. It is believed that the Moolavirat is Swayambhu (self manifested).

=== Pancha berams ===
As per Vaikhanasa Agamas, Venkateswara is represented by five deities (berams) including the Moolavirat which are together referred to as Pancha beramulu (Pancha means five; Beram means Deity). The five deities are Dhruva Beram (Moolavar), Kautuka Beram, Snapana Beram, Utsava Beram, Bali Beram. All the pancha berams are placed in the Garbha griha under Ananda Nilayam Vimanam.

1. Moolavirat or Dhruva Beram- In the centre of Garbha griha, under the Ananda Nilayam Vimana, the Moolavirat of Venkateswara is seen in standing posture on lotus base, with four arms, two holding Shanka and Chakra and one in Varada posture and other in Kati posture. This deity is considered the main source of energy for the temple and adorns with the Vaishnavite nama and jewels including vajra kiritam (diamond crown), Makarakundalas, Nagabharana, Makara Kanti, Saligrama haram, Lakshmi haram. Venkateswara's consort, Lakshmi stays on the chest of the Moolavirat as Vyuha Lakshmi.
2. Bhoga Srinivasa or Kautuka Beram - This is a small one-foot (0.3 m) silver idol donated the temple in 614 CE by the Pallava queen Samavai for use in festivals. Bhoga Srinivasa is placed near the left foot of Moolavirat and remains physically connected to the main idol through a sacred Sambandha Kroocha. The deity receives several daily sevas performed on behalf of Moolavirat, which gives the idol the name Bhoga Srinivasa (Telugu: Bhoga, "pleasure"). The deity is offered Ekanthaseva each day and the Sahasra Kalasabhisheka on Wednesdays.
3. Ugra Srinivasa or Snapana Beram - This deity represents the fearsome (Telugu: ugra, "angry") aspect of Venkateswara. It served as the temple's primary procession idol until 1330 CE, when it was replaced by the Malayappa Swami. Ugra Srinivasa now remains within the sanctum sanctorum and is taken out in procession only once a year on - Kaishika Dwadasi, before sunrise. This deity receives daily abhishekam on behalf of Moolavirat, which gives it designation Snapana Beram (Sanskrit: snapana, "cleansing")
4. Malayappa Swami or Utsava Beram - Malayappa is the temple's processional deity of the Temple and is always flanked by his consorts Sridevi and Bhudevi. He presides over all major festivals, including Brahmotsavams, Kalyanotsavam, Dolotsavam, Vasanthotsavam, Sahasra Deepalankarana Seva, Padmavati Parinyotsavams, Pushpapallaki, Anivara Asthanam, Ugadi Asthanam etc.
5. Koluvu Srinivasa or Bali Beram- Koluvu Srinivasa is regarded as Bali Beram and serves as the guardian deity of the temple, overseeing its financial and administrative affairs. Each morning, Koluvu seva (Telugu: koluvu, "engaged in") is performed, during which the previous day's offerings, income, expenditures are presented to the deity. At the same time, Panchanga Sravanam, is conducted, announcing the day's Tithi, sunrise and sunset timings, and nakshatra to Venkateswara.

=== Other murtis ===
Along with Pancha berams, the garbha griha also houses the panchaloha deities of Sita, Rama, Lakshmana, Rukmini, Krishna, Chakratalvar. The temple hosts the deities of Garuda (Vishnu's vehicle), Narasimha, Varadaraja, Kubera, Hanuman in their respective sub-shrines. The temple also host the deities of Shesha (Vishnu's serpent), Viswaksena, Sugriva, Ramanuja. Vimana Venkateswara, an exact replica icon of Venkateswara, is carved into the northwest corner of the second tier of the Ananda Nilayam Vimana.

== Worship ==
=== Puja ===
The temple follows the Vaikhanasa Agama tradition of worship, which is believed to have been revealed by the Sage Vikhanasa and propagated by his disciples Atri, Bhrigu, Marichi, and Kasyapa. Vaikhanasa is one of the principal traditions of Hinduism and regards Vishnu and his associated avatars as the Supreme God. The ancient texts prescribes six daily puja (worship) for Vishnu, of which at least one is mandatory. The prescribed rituals are classified as daily, weekly and periodical. Every day, a cowherd lights the lamps in the sanctum, after which the deity is awakened with the recitation of the Suprabhatam, followed by the Thomala Seva, during which the deity is adorned with flowers by 4.00 AM. Koluvu Srinivasa is then taken to the Tirumani Mandapam, where the accounts of the previous day are read. The Archakas then perform the Archana, during which the thousand names of Lord Vishnu are chanted. The first food offering, known as Balabhogam, is made in the morning. At noon, the second bell is rung, following which the Raja Bhogam ("Royal Feast") is offered. From 12:00 p.m., the daily Kalyanotsavam is performed and, the focus shifts from the Moola Virat to the Malayappa Swami utsava murti. The evening schedule include the Dolotsavam, Arjita Brahmotsavam, Vasanthotsavam and Sahasra Deepalankarana Sevas. Finally, by 1:30 a.m., the night Kainkaryams and Ekanta Seva are performed, during which the deity is ceremonially put to sleep. Weekly sevas are performed from Monday to Friday as follows:

- Visesha Pooja (Monday): The Archakas perform the Chaturdasa Kalasa Visesha Puja, a ritual sacred bath conducted using 14 vessels. Although originally a weekly seva, it is now organized by the TTD as an annual event on Vasant Panchami.
- Ashta Dala Padapadmaradhana (Tuesday): Following the second bell, the seva begins by offering of dhupam. This is followed by the recitation of the Venkateswara Ashtottara Satanamavali, during which a golden lotus is placed at the deity's feed for each name recited. A total of 108 such lotuses are offered to the deity. Upon completion of the ritual, an Archana is performed for Mahalakshmi and Alamelu Manga, followed by the Ratna Harathi and the regular Harathi.
- Sahasra Kalasabhishekam (Wednesday): This seva is offered to the silver Bhoga Srinivasa idol. This is also performed after the second bell. Bhoga Srinivasa is bought outside the Bangaru Vakili and is connected by means of thin silk rope with the Mula Virat inside the Sanctum. The deity is bathed with holy water from 1,008 silver vessels and one golden vessel, accompanied by the chanting of Vedic hymns.
- Thiruppavada Seva (Thursday): Also known as Annakoototsavam, The deity is stripped of all ornaments and rich dressing and is substituted for a simple Dhoti and Uttaraneeyam. The Thirunaman Kaappu and Kasturi on the forehead of the main deity are also reduced in size. The eyes of the Lord is visible. This is also known as Netra Darshanam. To absorb the immense energy of the Lord, a large mound of Pulihora (Tamarind Rice) and other sweet preparations including Jilebi is placed in the Bangaru Vakili which absorbs the energy. The meals act as a veil (Paavada) so that the Lord's supreme graze does not affect the pilgrims.
- Poolangi Seva (Friday): After the Tiruppavadai Seva, the temple observes some rituals like suddhi (cleaning of the temple) etc., and the Moola Virat is adorned with Velvet Gown from Crown to the Feet along with flower garlands.
- Abhishekam (Friday): After the regular Suprabhata and Thomala Sevas are done in private, the Abhishekam (Sacred Bath) is performed to the Lord. The Abhishekam starts with water brought from Akasa Ganga Theertham, then with Milk, then with Suddhodakam, Chandanam and other scented articles like powdered Pachcha Karpooram, Saffron paste and drops of civet oil etc. brought in silver vessels. The Pancha Suktams are chanted during this process. Finally, An abhishekam is exclusively done with turmeric paste for Goddess Lakshmi's image on the Moola Virat's chest.

The Naalayira Divya Prabandam is under tenkalai tradition, however both traditions are permitted to recite. The rituals follow the vadakalai sect of Vaikhanasa agama shastra. The priests are born in four familial groups all following Vaikhanasa and Vadakalai traditions. The acharyas of the temple is the pedda and Chinna Tirupati Jeeyar Swami of the tenkalai tradition and the ekanki swamis of both kalai traditions. This is the only major mixed divyadesams with both vadakalai and tenkalai traditions. The different mutts all have a role in the temple. Prominent vadakalai groups that have significant influence include Ahobila mutt, Parakala matha, vaikhanasa priests, and thathacharyas. Prominent tenkalai mutts include pedda and Chinna Tirupati jeeyar mutt, who reside in Tirupati and are trustees to the temple. Overall, vadakalai have slightly more power in temple traditions, however the power is divided among more entities while the tenkalai have more unified powe under the Tirumala Tirupati Jeeyar mutts. Many aspects of the temple practices relates to both traditions and devotees will see both symbols widely used. The advaitas have influence relating to the recitation of Vedas.

During Dhanurmasam (mid-December to mid-January), various changes occur in the style of worship. First of all, the Suprabhatam which is recited every morning is replaced with Tiruppavai written by one of the twelve Alvars, Andal. Each Pasuram of Tiruppavai is covered for each day. The lord is worshipped as Krishna. This pattern continues for the next 30 days. Greater emphasis is placed upon special worship of Krishna as during the Ekanta Seva, the Bhoga Srinivasa idol is replaced by a silver idol of Lord Krishna on the swing. The Thomala Seva is performed silently without any chants. During Archana, the standard Tulasi offerings to the lord is replaced by Bilva (Aegle marmelos) leaves. Special Naivedhyams, including Pongal, Jaggery Dosa, Shundal and Seera are offered the Lord specially after the first bell. Special Alankarams, including decoration of the lord with Parrots, made form leaves is also done. It is during this sacred month that Vaikunta Ekadasi falls which is the busiest day of the year in the temple. This time sees a large footfall of devotees. The Vaikunta Dwaram or Uttara Dwaram is opened for 2 days during this month (Vaikunta Ekadasi and Dwadasi). It is located towards the left of the main sanctum. For 21 days, the Nalayira Divya Prabandham is recited by authorised scholars under the leadership of Jeeyars in the form of the Adhyayana Utsavam. As legend put it- entry through door is said to bring some extraordinary blessings of the Lord Venkateswara which were normally meant for the Gods who live in Vaikuntam. On the final day of the month, garlands from Andal Sannidhi is carried off to Tirumala for adorning the Lord.

=== Naivedhyam ===
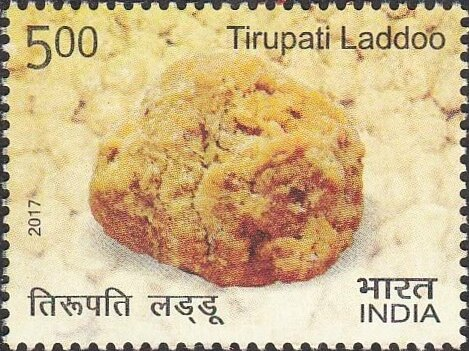
Postal stamp issued by India Post (in 2017) commemorating the Tirupati Laddu

The Tirupati Laddu is given at Tirumala Temple as prasadam. Tirupati Laddu received the Geographical indication tag which entitles only Tirumala Tirupati Devasthanams to make or sell it. Many other prasadams are also offered to Venkateswara and they are classified as Anna-prasadams and Panyarams. Annaprasadams include chakerapongal (sweet), Pulihora (tamarind rice), miryala pongal, kadambham, daddojanam (curd rice). Panyarams include laddu, vada, Dosa, Appam, jilebi, muruku, poli, payasam. Free meals are given daily to the pilgrims. On Thursdays, the Tiruppavada seva is conducted, where huge quantity of pulihora is offered to Venkateswara by heaping up into a pyramidal shape in Tirummani mandapam (ghanta mandapam).

=== Darshan ===
To manage the large number of devotees visiting the temple, Tirumala Tirupati Devasthanam constructed two Vaikuntam Queue Complexes: one in the year 1983 and the other in the year 2000. Vaikuntam Queue complexes have rooms where devotees can sit and wait until their turn for darshan. According to tradition, it is important for a devotee to have darshan of Bhuvaraha swamy temple lying on the northern banks of Swami Pushkarini before having darshan of Venkateswara in the main temple.

In 2013, the administration introduced a separate queue for pedestrian pilgrims. Free but limited number of biometric tokens are issued for the pilgrims to access this special queue. Tokens are provided on a first-come, first-served basis. The pilgrims can worship Venkateswara on the allotted time slots issued in the token. There are two entry points for the foot-path pilgrims: Alipiri Mettu and Srivari Mettu. Alipiri Mettu is open round the clock, whereas Srivari Mettu is open from 06:00 to 18:00.

To manage the large number of visitors, the temple administration has established various darshan types to ensure an orderly and efficient flow of pilgrims.

Sarva Darshan (Free Darshan): Sarva Darshan is the general queue available to all devotees free of charge. It is the most common and popular type of darshan. Devotees stand in line for several hours, sometimes even overnight, to have a glimpse of Venkateswara. The waiting time can vary depending on the crowd, festivals, and other factors.

=== Hair tonsuring ===
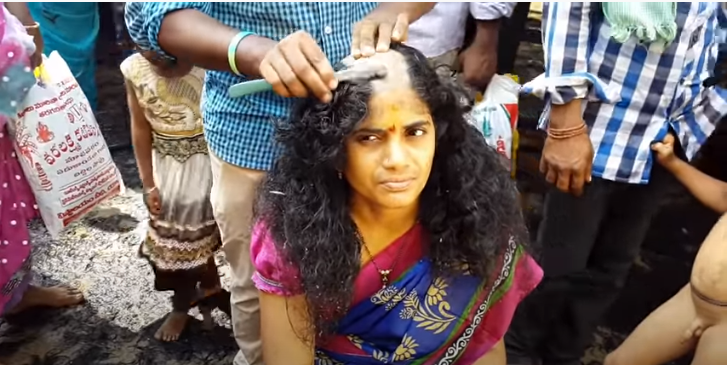
An example of the hair tonsuring ceremony

Many devotees have their head tonsured as "Mokku", an offering to God. The daily amount of hair collected is over a ton. The hair is collected and is sold internationally creating a substantial profit for the temple. As per legend, when Venkateswara was hit on his head by a cowherd, a small portion of his scalp became bald. This was noticed by Neela Devi, a Gandharva princess. Immediately, she cut a portion of her hair and, with her magic, implanted it on his scalp. Venkateswara noticed her sacrifice. As hair is a beautiful asset of the female form, he promised her that all his devotees who come to his abode would offer their hair to him, and she would be the recipient of all the hair received. Hence, it is believed that hair offered by the devotees is accepted by Neela Devi. The hill, Neeladri, one of the seven hills, is named after her. Traditionally the barbers employed to do the tonsuring were male and from the Nayee caste and this caused some discrimination and failed to resolve the requests from women that they would like a female barber. A protest led by Kagganapalli Radha Devi overturned the objections and temple agreed to appoint women barbers. Devi was recognised by Andhra Pradesh in 2017 and with an award of the Nari Shakti Puraskar by the President of India in 2019.

=== Hundi (donation pot) ===
As per legend, it is believed that Srinivasa had to make arrangements for his wedding. Kubera credited money to Venkateswara (a form of the god Vishnu) for his marriage with Padmavathi. Srinivasa sought a loan of one crore and 1.14 crore (1,14,00,000) coins of gold from Kubera and had Vishvakarma, the divine architect, create heavenly surroundings in the Seshadri hills. Together, Srinivasa and Padmavathi lived for all eternity while Goddess Lakshmi, understanding the commitments of Vishnu, chose to live in his heart forever. In remembrance of this, devotees go to Tirupati to donate money in Venkateswara's hundi (donation pot) so that he can pay it back to Kubera. The hundi collections go as high as ₹22.5 million a day.

=== Thulabaram ===
In the Thulabaram ritual, a devotee sits on a pan of a weighing balance and the other pan is filled with materials greater than the weight of the devotee. Devotees usually offer sugar, jaggery, tulsi leaves, banana, gold, coins. This is mostly performed with newborn babies or children.

== Festivals ==
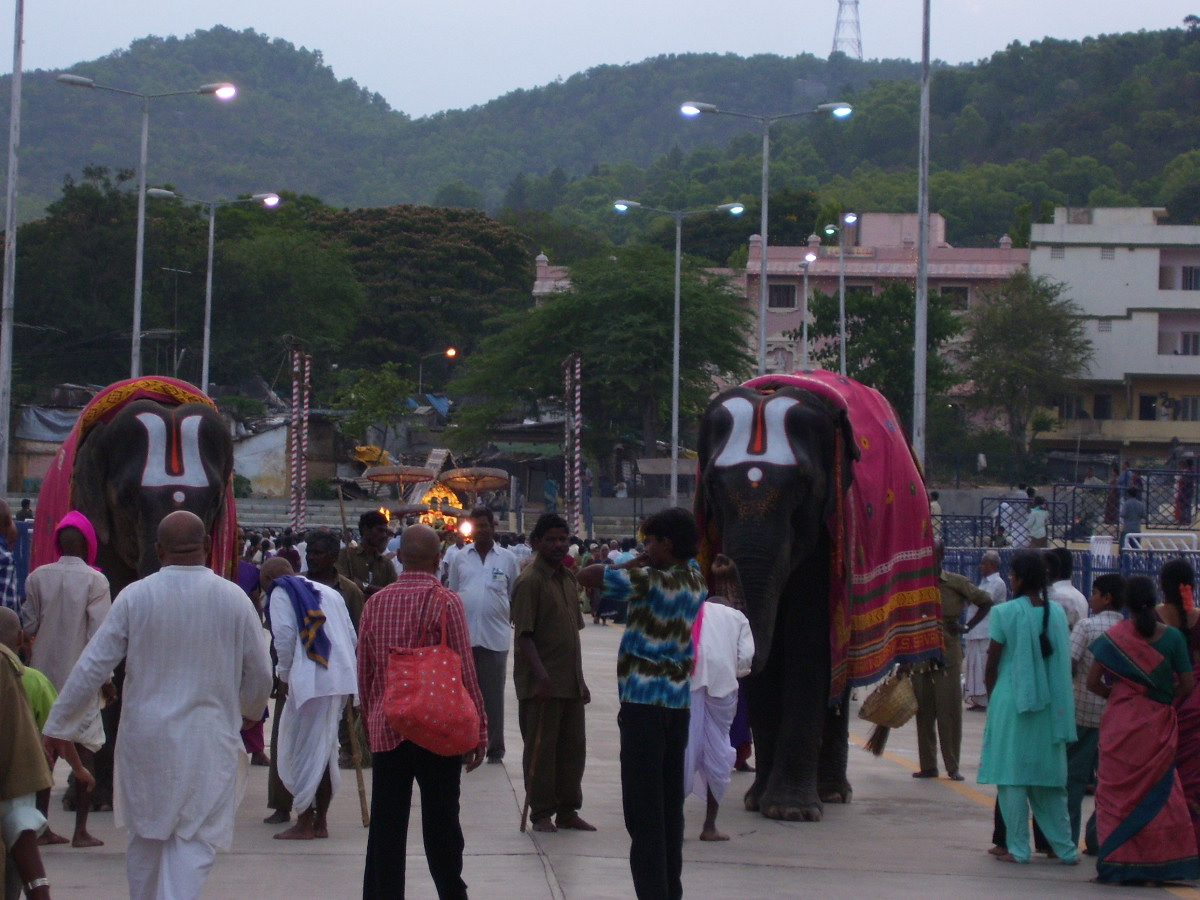
Elephants marching during a festival at Tirumala

In the Venkateswara Temple over 433 festivals are being observed in 365 days of a year suiting the title "Nitya Kalyanam Paccha Toranam" where every day is a festival.

=== Vaikunta Ekadasi ===
Vaikunta Ekadasi, the day on which it is believed that Vaikunta Dwarams will be opened and the most important Vasihnavite festival, is celebrated with grandeur in Tirumala. The Tirumala Venkateswara Temple will be flooded with devotees on a single day with numbers reaching up to 150,000, to have a darshan of Venkateswara through special entrance which encircles inner sanctum called "Vaikunta Dwaram".

=== Rathasapthami ===
Rathasapthami is another festival, celebrated during February, when Venkateswara's processional deity (Malayappa) is taken in a procession around the temple on seven different vahanams starting from early morning to late night.

Other annual festivals include Rama Navami, Janmashtami, Ugadi, Teppotsavam (Float Festival), Sri Padmavati Parinayotsavams, Pushpa yagam, Pushpa pallaki, Vasanthotsavam (spring festival) conducted in March–April, were celebrated with great splendor.

== Songs and hymns ==
Venkateswara Suprabhatam is the first and pre-dawn seva performed to Venkateswara at Sayana Mandapam inside sanctum sanctorum of Tirumala Temple. 'Suprabhatam' is a Sanskrit term which literally means 'Good Morning' and is meant to wake up the deity from His celestial sleep. Venkateswara Suprabhatam hymns were composed by Prathivadhi Bhayankaram Annangaracharya during the 13th century and consists of 70 slokas in four parts including Suprabhatam(29), Stotram(11), Prapatti(14) and Mangalasasanam(16). The thirteenth sloka of Venkateswara Suprabhatam is as follows:

Devanagari
श्रीमन्नभीष्ट-वरदाखिललोक-बन्धो
श्रीश्रीनिवास-जगदेकदयैकसिन्धो ।
श्रीदेवतागृहभुजान्तर-दिव्यमूर्ते

श्रीवेङ्कटाचलपते तव सुप्रभातम् ॥

Telugu script
శ్రీమన్నాభీష్ట -వరదఖిలలోక -బంధో
శ్రీ శ్రీనివాస-జగదేకదయైకసింధో |
శ్రీదేవతాగృహభుజాన్తర-దివ్యమూర్తే

శ్రీవెంకటాచలపతే తవ సుప్రభాతం||

IAST
śrīmannabhīṣṭa-varadākhilaloka-bandho
śrīśrīnivāsa-jagadekadayaikasindho ।
śrīdevatāgṛhabhujāntara-divyamūrte

śrīveṅkaṭācalapate tava suprabhātam ॥

One with Lakshmi! One who grants boons! Friend of all the worlds! Abode of Sri Lakshmi! The matchless ocean of compassion! One having a charming form on account of the chest which is the abode of Sri Lakshmi! Lord of Venkatachala! May it be an auspicious dawn to Thee. ॥ 13 ॥

Tallapaka Annamacharya (Annamayya), the poet saint of the 14th century, one of the greatest Telugu poets and a great devotee of Venkateswara, had sung 32,000 songs in praise of Venkateswara. All his songs which are in Telugu and Sanskrit, are referred to as Sankirtanas and are classified as Sringara Sankirtanalu and Adhyatma Sankirtanalu.

== The Seven Hills ==
The temple is located on seven hills. The presiding deity is also referred to as Sapthagirisha or Lord of Seven hills. It is believed that seven hills, also referred to as Saptagiri, represent the seven hoods of Adisesha. The seven hills are as follows:

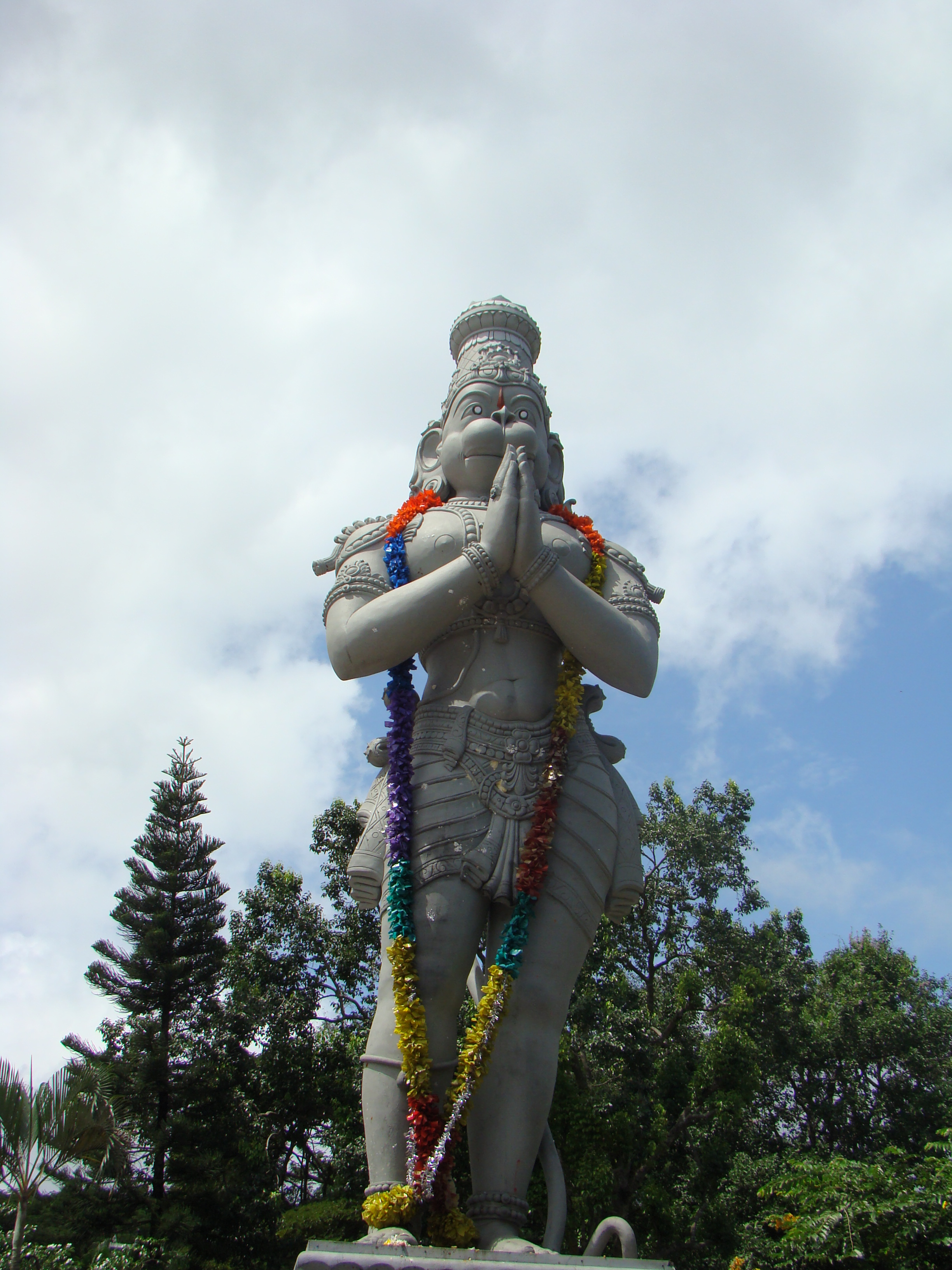
A statue of Hanuman in prayer pose near Alipiri gate in Tirumala

- Vrushabhadri—Hill of Vrishabasura, who was killed by Srinivasa
- Anjanadri—Hill of Hanuman.
- Neeladri—Hill of Neela Devi
- Garudadri or Garudachalam—Hill of Garuda, the vahana of Vishnu
- Seshadri or Seshachalam—Hill of Sesha, the dasa of Vishnu
- Narayanadri—Hill of Narayana. Srivari Padalu (footprints of Venkateswara) are located here
- Venkatadri—Hill of Venkateswara

== Subshrines ==
=== Varadaraja Temple ===
There is a small shrine dedicated to Varadaraja located in Vimana-pradakshinam, towards left of Vendivakili (silver entrance) while entering temple. It is not known when this deity was installed. The stone deity is sitting posture facing west.

=== Yoga Narasimha Temple ===
A shrine is dedicated to Narasimha in North-east corner of the Vimana-Pradakshina. The shrine is said to have been built between 1330 CE and 1360 CE. The Yoga-Narasimha is seen sitting in cross-legged posture bound by yoga patta and holding Shankha and chakra in upper two hands and two lower hands in yoga mudra.

=== Garuthmantha Temple ===
A small shrine dedicated to Garuda the vehicle of Venkateswara is situated exactly opposite to the Bangaruvakili (Golden Entrance) of Jaya-Vijaya. This sub-shrine is part of Garudamandapam. The Garuthmantha deity is six feet tall and faces west looking towards Venkateswara inside Garbhagriha.

=== Bhuvaraha Swamy Temple ===
Bhuvaraha Swamy Temple is the temple dedicated to Varaha an incarnation of Vishnu. This temple is believed to be older than Venkateswara Temple. The temple lies on the Northern Banks of Swami Pushkarini. As per tradition, at first Naivedyam will be offered to Bhuvaraha Swamy before offering it to Venkateswara in main Temple. And also as per tradition, devotees should have the darshan of Bhuvaraha swamy before Venkateswara.

=== Bedi-Anjaneya Temple ===
Bedi-Anjaneya Temple is the sub-shrine dedicated to Hanuman. The temple lies exactly opposite to the Mahadwaram near Akhilandam (place where coconuts are offered). The deity in this temple has both of his hands handcuffed (Telugu Language:Bedilu).

=== Vakulamatha Sannidhi ===
Vakulamatha is the mother of Venkateswara. There is statue dedicated to her in the main temple just ahead of Varadaraja shrine. The deity is in sitting posture. As per legend, she supervises the preparation of food that is to be offered to her son. For this reason a hole is made to the wall which separates Vakulamatha sannidhi and Srivari potu(Kitchen).

=== Kubera Sannidi ===
There is a sub-shrine dedicated to Kubera within the Vimanapradakshina. The deity lies to the right side of Garbhagriha and faces south towards preciding deity.

=== Ramanuja Shrine ===
The Shrine of Sri Ramanuja is located adjacent to the northern corridor of the Vimana Pradakshinam. It is also known as the Bhashyakara Sannidhi. The shrine was built around in the 13th century CE.

== Notable devotees ==
Ramanuja (1017–1137) the most important Acharya of Sri Vaishnavism. was responsible for managing the worshipping procedures and other affairs of the Venkateswara temple. He is credited for gifting the holy conch and the discus, the weapons of Vishnu during his visit. So he is considered as 'Acharya'(Guru or teacher) to the himself. He established the Pedda Jeeyar Matam. He has a sannidhi(shrine) inside the temple which was built by Sri Ananthalwan.

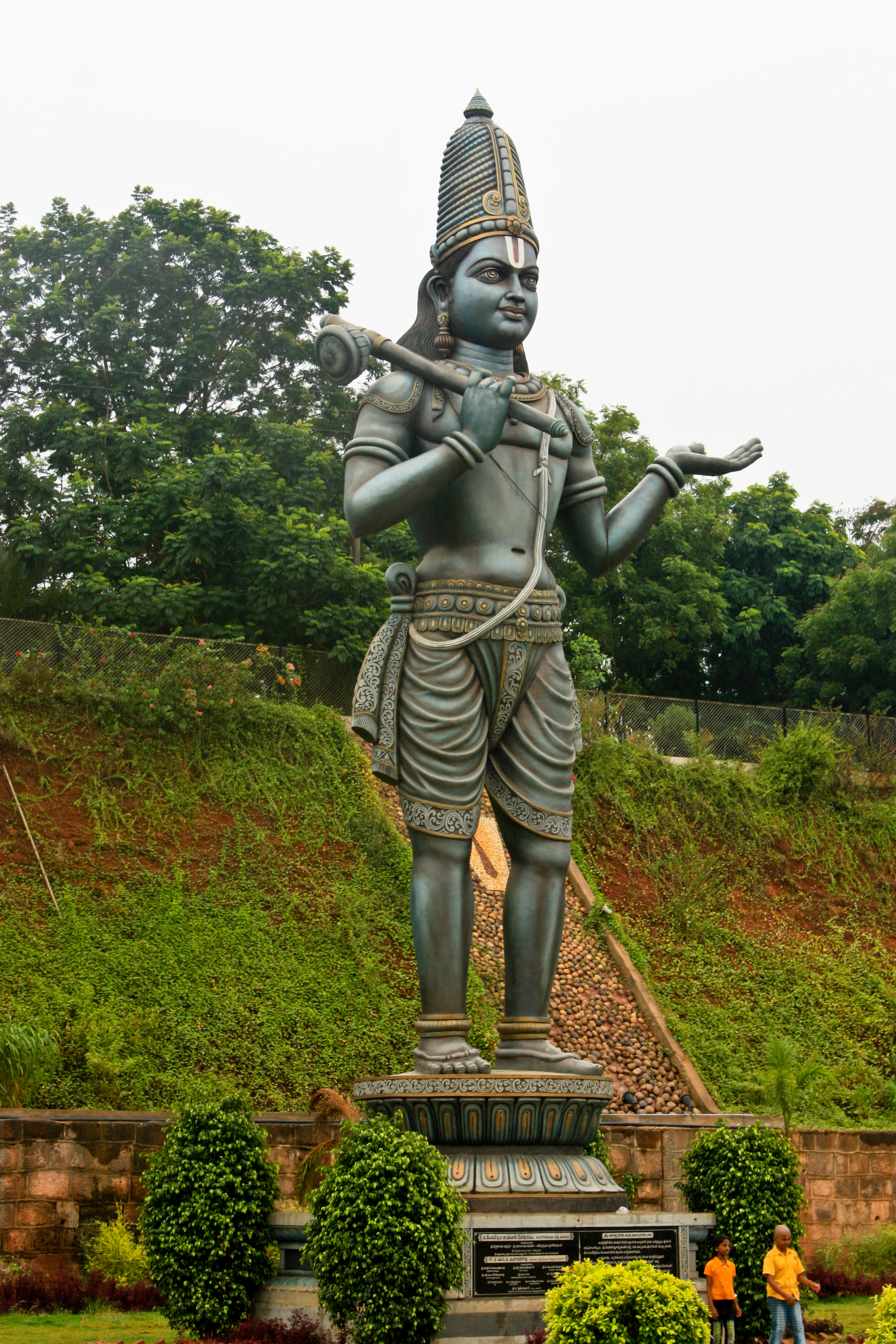
Statue of Pada-kavita Pitaamaha, Sri Tallapaka Annamacharya (or Annamayya) - official songmaster of the Tirumala Venkateswara Temple

Sri Tallapaka Annamacharya (or Annamayya) (22 May 1408 – 4 April 1503) was the official songmaster of the Tirumala Venkateswara Temple, and a Telugu composer who composed around 36000 keertanas, many of which were in praise of Venkateswara, the presiding deity of the temple.

Hathiram Bhavaji was a saint from Ayodhya who visited Tirumala around 1500 CE on a pilgrimage and became a devotee of Venkateswara.

Tarigonda Vengamamba (1730-1817) was a female poet and a staunch devotee of Lord Venkateswara. She was well known for her works including the Sri Venkatachala Mahatyam. To reward her devotion, till date, the Harathi during Ekanta Seva is performed in her honour to the Lord. Her descendant pays pearls as a fee for the aforementioned to be done. The Annaprasadam Kendram in Tirumala is named after her.

== Religious significance ==
The temple is considered one of the eight Swayambhu Kshetras of Vishnu where presiding deity is believed to have manifested on its own. Seven other temples in the line are Srirangam Ranganathaswamy temple, Bhu Varaha Swamy temple, and Vanamamalai Perumal Temple in South India and Saligrama in Nepal, Naimisaranya, Pushkar and Badrinath Temple in North India.

The temple is revered by Alvars in Divya Prabandham. The temple is classified as a Divyadesam, one of the 108 Vishnu temples that are mentioned in these books. The benefits acquired by a pilgrimage to Venkatachala are mentioned in the Rig Veda and Asthadasa Puranas. In these epics, Venkateswara is described as the great bestower of boons. There are several legends associated with the manifestation of the at Tirumala.

== See also ==
- Tirumala Tirupati Devasthanams
- Padmavati Temple
- Mahalakshmi Temple, Kallur
- Mahalakshmi Temple, Kolhapur
- Tirumala Dhruva Bera
- Kapila Theertham
- Srikalahasteeswara Temple
- Sri Lakshmi Narayani Golden Temple
- List of temples under Tirumala Tirupati Devasthanams
- Bruce's Code
