= Vaikhanasa =

Tradition of Hinduism

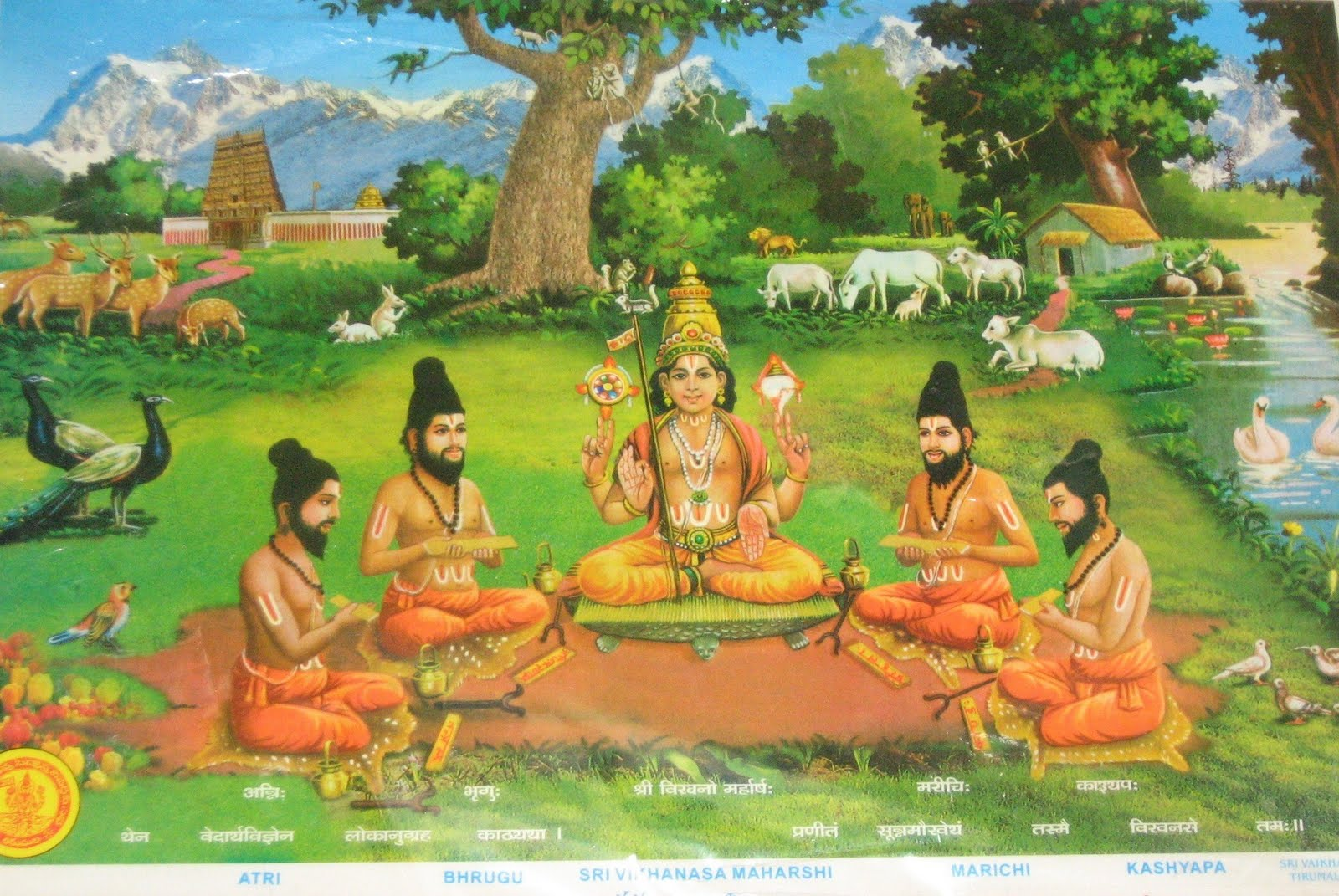
Rishi Vikhanasa with his four disciples: Atri, Bhrigu, Marichi, and Kashyapa.

Vaikhanasa (Sanskrit: वैखानस, romanized: Vaikhānasa) or Vaikhanasagama (Sanskrit: वैखानसागम, romanized: Vaikhānasāgama) is a tradition of Hinduism that primarily worships Vishnu (and his associated avatars) as the Supreme God. The tradition draws its name from the philosophy propounded by its founder, Sage Vikhanasa.

Vaikhanasa is classified as a Vaishnava Agama, concerned with the performance of practices such as temple rituals. Its adherents are primarily the Brahmins who belong to the school of the Krishna Yajurveda Taittiriya Shakha and the Vaikhanasa Kalpasutra. It is principally monotheistic in its philosophy, whilst also incorporating elements that could be described as being panentheistic. Like the Pancharatra, it is well established in South India.

== History ==
The Vaikhanasas originated as a group of forest-dwelling ascetics. In the Manava Dharmashastra, the legendary Manu discusses the vanaprastha, forest-dweller, the third of the four ashrama stages of life, and mentions a "Vaikhanasa rule." Other ancient authorities support this reference, so it seems there was a Vaikhanasa ascetic community before the common era. They are mentioned in the Narayaniyam, which is a late section of the Mahabharata of uncertain date but probably no earlier than the third century CE. Surviving Vaikhanasa sutras are no older than the fourth century CE.

Inscriptions from perhaps the eighth century CE identify Vaikhanasas as temple priests, and from the end of the tenth century they are prominently mentioned in South Indian inscriptions. Vaikhanasas were the priests of Vishnu temples, trusted with administering the temples and their lands.

Vedanta Desika, a leader of the Sri Vaishnava school, has given equal importance to both vaikhanasa and Pancharatra system in his work Saranagati Deepika 32 :

tvAm paancaraatrikanayEna pruthakvidhEna vaikhanasEna ca pathA niyatAdhikArA: |

samjn~A vishESha niyamEna samarcayanta: preetyA nayanti phalavanti dinAni dhanyA: ||

Today, Vaikhanasas are the chief priests in more than half of the Vaishnava temples in the South Indian states of Tamil Nadu, Andhra Pradesh, and parts of Karnataka.

== Doctrine ==
Vaikhanasas claim to be a surviving school of Vedic ritual, the Taittiriya Shakha of the Krishna Yajurveda. Vaikhanasa tradition says the sage Vikhanasa, who was a manifestation of Vishnu, acquired an education of the Vedas and the Shastras. He learnt how to worship Vishnu as an arcāvatāra, a temple image regarded to be an iconic form of the deity. He is regarded to have travelled to the holy forest known as the Naimisharanya and composed the Vaikhanasa Kalpasutra and taught the treatise known as the Sri Vaikhanasa Bhagavad Shastra to his four disciples, the sages Atri, Bhrigu, Kashyapa and Marichi, which contained the procedures of Samurtarcana, Amurtarchana, and devotional service to Vishnu in the form of his images.

Most Vaikhanasa literature is almost completely concerned with rituals, prescribing the rituals and their rules of performance. To Vaikhanasas, their temple worship is a continuation of the Vedic yajna. Regular and correct worship of Vishnu in a temple are regarded to bring the same results as the fire sacrifice even for people who do not maintain their fires.

Vaikhanasa texts venerate four aspects of Vishnu: Purusha, the principle of life; Satya, the static aspect of deity; Achyuta, the immutable aspect; and Aniruddha, the irreducible aspect. They prescribe the two primary mantras of Vaishnavism: Om Namo Bhagavate Vasudevaya and Om Namo Narayanaya. Distinction is emphasised between Vishnu in his form of niṣkalā, a primeval and indivisible form unperceived even by Brahma, and his form of sakala, the figured, divisible, emanated, and movable form. In his form of Sakala, the deity is regarded to respond to devotional meditation. Vishnu's consort, Shri, is regarded to be as important as nature, Prakriti, as the power (shakti) of Vishnu.

The Vaikhanasa doctrine states that spiritual liberation (moksha) is release into Vishnu's abode of Vaikuntha. The nature of a devotee's moksha is regarded to be dependent on their performance of japa (attentive repetition of prayer), huta, yajna (ritual sacrifice), archana (service to images), and dhyana (yogic meditation). Of the four, the text known as the Marichi Samhita offers precedence to archana.

== Adherents ==
The Vaikhanasa Brahmins/Vaikhanasas are a Vaishnavite Brahmin community of about 4000 families dispersed throughout South India in Tamil Nadu, Andhra Pradesh, and parts of Karnataka. They can also be found occasionally in some regions of the United States of America, Germany, Australia, UK, and some parts of Europe.

Some of the prominent Hindu temples following the Vaikhanasa Agama are

1. Venkateswara Temple, Tirumala
2. Sri Lakshmi Varada Yogabhoga Narasimha Swamy Temple, Shanthigrama, Hassan, Karnataka, India
3. Sri Parthasarathy Temple, Triplicane, Chennai, Tamil Nadu, India
4. Yogananda Lakshmi Narasimha Swamy Temple, Mattapalli
5. Arulmigu Venkatachalapathi Swamy Temple, Oppiliappan Koil, Thirunageswaram
6. Arulmigu Sthala Shayana Perumal Temple, Thirukkadalmallai (Mamallapuram), Tamil Nadu
7. Shiva Vishnu Temple, Livermore, California, USA
8. India Cultural Center and Temple, Memphis, Tennessee, USA
9. Sri Prasanna Venkateswaraa Swamy Temple (Sai Baba Mandir), Monmouth Junction, NJ, USA
10. Sri Venkateswara Swamy Temple (Chinna Tirupathi), Dwarakatirumala, Eluru Dist., Andhra Pradesh, India.
11. Sri Veeranarayana swamy Temple, Belavadi, Chikmagalur Dist, Karnataka
12. Sri Venkateswara Swamy Temple (Konaseema Tirupathi), Vadapalli, East Godavari Dist, Andhra Pradesh, India.
13. Sri Venkateswara Swamy Temple (Tirumala Giri), Tirumala Giri, Jaggayyapet, Krishna Dist., Andhra Pradesh, India.
14. Sri Lakshmi Varaha Venkataramana Swamy Temple (Abhinava Tirupathi), Anjaneya Nagar, 3rd Stage Banashankari, Bengaluru, Karnataka, India.
15. Sri Ranganatha Swamy Temple Ballapur pet, Bangalore Karnataka, India
16. Sri Venkateswara Swamy Temple, Ilupeju, Lagos, Nigeria.
17. Sri Venkateswara Swamy Temple, Srigiri, Ongole, Andhra Pradesh, India
18. Sri Rama and Sri Tuppadanjaneyaswamy Temple, Rangaswamy temple street, Avenue road cross, Bangalore.
19. Sri Chennakeshava swamy temple, Ganigarapet, Bangalore, Karnataka, India.
20. Sri Venkataramanswamy Temple Avenue road Bangalore
21. Sri Venkataramanswamy Temple Dharmarayaswamy temple road, Ganigarapet Bangalore
22. Sri Lakshminarasimha Swamy temple, Near Upparpet Police station, Bangalore.
23. Sri Lakshmi Narasimha Swamy Temple, Mangalagiri, Andhra Pradesh
24. Sri Lakshmi Narasimha Swamy Temple, Vedadri, Jaggayyapet, Krishna Dist., Andhra Pradesh, India.
25. Sri Biligirirangaswamy temple Biligirirangana betta, Yelandur Tq Chamarajanagara district karnataka
26. Sri venugopalaswamy temple, Kere thondanur pandavapura tq mandya district, karnataka
27. Sri Veeranjaneya swmy temple mulabagilu tq kolar district, karnataka
28. Sri Valmiki anjaneya swmy temple sajjanarao circle Bengaluru karnataka
29. Sri Venkateswara Swami (Balaji) Temple of Greater Chicago
30. Sri Lakshmi Temple Ashland Boston US
31. Sri Srinivasa Perumal Temple, Singapore
32. Flower Mound Hindu Temple of Flower Mound Texas
33. Sri Devanathan Perumal Temple Thiruvahintharapuram, cuddalore, India
34. Sri Varatharaja Perumal Temple Puducherry, India
35. Sri Venkateswara swamy Temple, Then thirumalai, Mettupalayam, Coimbatore
36. Sri Venugopalaswamy temple, Guraza, Krishna District, Andhra pradesh
37. Sri Chennakeshava swamy temple, Tarakaturu, Machilipatnam, Krishna District, Andhra Pradesh, India.
38. Sri Chennakesava swamy temple, Mallavolu, Machilipatnam, Andhra Pradesh, India.
39. Sri Chennakeshava swamy temple, Vullipalem, Repalle, Guntur District, Andhra Pradesh, India
40. Sri Venugopal swamy temple, kodali, krishna district, Andhra pradesh, India
41. Sri Lakshminarashima swamy temple, sholingur, vellor district, Tamil Nadu, India
42. Sri Vijayendra Swamy Temple, Bethamangala, Kolar District, Karnataka, India
43. Sri Sundara Varadaraja Perumal Temple, Uthiramerur, Kanchipuram, Tamil Nadu, India
44. Sri Sundararaja Perumal Temple, Velianallore village, Kanchipuram, Tamil nadu, India
45. sri chennakesava swamy temple, Mallavolu, Machilipatnam, Andhra Pradesh, India.
46. Sri Kallazhagar Temple, Thirumaliruncholai, Alagarkoil, Madurai, Tamil Nadu, India.
47. Sri Venkatesa Perumal Temple, Sowcarpet, Chennai, Tamil Nadu, India
48. Sri Adhi Jegannatha Perumal Temple, Thiruppullani, Ramnad Dist, Tamil Nadu, India
49. Sri Vegu Sundhara Varadharaja Perumal Temple, Sakkaramallur, Vellore district, Tamil Nadu, India.
50. Sri Prasanna Venkatesa Perumal Temple, Nungambakkam, Chennai, Tamil Nadu, India
51. Sri Madhava Perumal Temple, Mylapore, Chennai, Tamil Nadu, India
52. Sri kesava Swamy temple, gandredu, pedapudi mandal, east godavari dist, andhra pradesh.
53. sri thiruvenkatamudiyan temple, south thirupathy, Ariyakudi sivagangai district, Tamilnadu.
54. Sri LakshmiNarayana Swamy Temple, Sekharipuram Agraharam, Palakkad, Kerala, India.
55. Venkatachalapathy Temple, Kumarapuram Village
56. Srimath Khadri Lakshmi Narasimha Swamy Temple, Kadiri, Andhra Pradesh.
57. Madanagopalaswamy Temple, Dangeru, K. Gangavaram mandal, Konaseema Dist., Andhra Pradesh, India.
58. Sri Bhu Sametha Sri Venkateswara Swamy Temple, Sivala, K. Gangavaram mandal, Konaseema Dist., Andhra Pradesh, India
59. Sri Seetaramachandraswamy Temple, Kota, K. Gangavaram Mandal, Konaseema Dist., Andhra Pradesh, India.
60. Sri Govindaraja Swamy Temple, Tirupati, Andhra Pradesh.
61. Sri Kodandarama Swamy Temple, Tirupati, Andhra Pradesh.
62. Sri Lakshmi Narasimha Swamy Temple, Ramapuram, Chennai.
63. Sri Gajendra varadha raja perumal temple, tirupattur(635601), Tamil Nadu
64. Sri Kalyana Venkateswara Swamy Temple, Srinivasa Mangapuram, Tirupati, Andhra Pradesh.
65. Sri Vedanarayana Swamy Temple, Nagalapuram, Andhra Pradesh.
66. Sri Venkateshwara Swamy Temple T.T.D Jubilee Hills, Hyderabad, Telangana.
67. Venugopala Swamy Temple, Garikaparru, Krishna District, Andhra Pradesh.

== Symbols ==
Temples and images with the Vaikhanasas are of more importance than perhaps any other sect of Hinduism. In accordance with Vaikhanasa doctrine of the two forms of Vishnu, the Nishkala, the unfigured, and the Sakala, the figured, two cult images are distinguished. There is the large immovable image representing Vishnu's Niskala form, which is ritually placed in a sanctuary and elaborately consecrated, and a smaller movable image representing Vishnu's Sakala form. If the devotee wishes for temporal and eternal results he should worship both forms. But if he is after only eternal results he should worship the immovable image.

After purification and meditation to identify with Vishnu, the devotee surrenders to Vishnu and places the movable image on a bathing pedestal and elaborately bathes it. This is preparation for receiving the presence of God by immediate contact via a connecting string. The invocation starts with a Mantra, sacred utterance, saying that the Imperishable is linked to the Perishable and that the Self is released from all evil as it knows God. Flowers are presented to all the deities present. Then the hymn called the Aatmasukta is recited that identifies the body of the devotee with the cosmos, followed by meditation on Vishnu's Niskala aspect: these parts of the ritual are to request Vishnu to take his Sakala form in the movable image so that the devotee can converse with Him. A Puja ceremony takes place with God as the royal guest, followed by a Homa, offering into the fire [Homaagni], and a Bali [offering-but not animal sacrifice] with something that may be visible, touchable, audible, or eatable. An offering of [Havis - anything offered as an oblation with fire], cooked food, is important as the God's meal. Afterwards the Prasaada (Food that was offered to God) is eaten by the worshipers and devotees. The offering area is cleaned and a Bali of cooked rice sprinkled with butter is offered to Vishnu. Then comes a Pradakshina [circumambulation from left to right clockwise as a kind of worship]around the temple. After Daksina, the officiating Brahman's share of the Prasadam, is given, Vishnu is meditated upon as the personal manifestation of the sacrifice. Finally Puspanjali, known as Mantra Pushpam, that is, offering a handful of flowers at the God's lotus feet after chanting the holy Mantraas, and the temple door is closed after Mangala arathi.
