= Malayappa Swami =

Tirumala Venkateswara Temple deity in India

Malayappa Swami is the utsava murti (procession deity) in the Tirumala Venkateswara Temple, Tirumala and is worshipped during religious ceremonies and processions in which it would be inappropriate to use the main deity (for example one which requires the deity to be carried or moved).

The Malayappa deity is classed as a Swayambhu and was discovered in 1339 AD.

== Description ==
Malayappa Swami is seen in the standing pose and is a replica of the Dhruva Beram (The presiding deity). The two upper arms hold the Shankha and the Sudarshana Chakra, while the two lower arms are in yoga poses. The right arm is in the Varada hasta pose (boon giving) and the lower left arm is in the Katyavalambita pose (palm perpendicular to the ground and resting on the hip). The idol stands about three feet tall on a platform of about 14 inches height.

== Sridevi idol ==
The idol of Sridevi is always placed on the Left-hand side of Sri Malayappa Swami. The idol is 26 inches in height and stands on a 4-inch pedestal. The panchaloha idol is seen with the left hand in the Kataka hasta pose. In this pose, the fingers are partially closed, as if holding a lotus. The right hand hangs loosely on the side and the fingers are held in the Gajakarna pose.

== Bhudevi idol ==
The idol of Bhudevi is always seen on the Right-hand side of the Malayappa Swami idol. The idol is very similar to the idol of Sridevi to signify that Sridevi and Bhudevi represent the two equal spirits of Goddess Lakshmi, the consort of Vishnu. The only difference in the idols is the swap in the hand poses. The idol of Bhudevi has her right hand in Kataka hasta pose and the left in Gajakarna pose. Bhudevi is regarded as the consort of Varaha, Vishnu's third incarnation.

== Worship ==
=== Order ===
The order that represents the Lord - Venkateshwara (Main Deity - Dhruva Bēram), Bhoga Srinivasa (Kautaka Bēram), Malayappa Swami with consorts (Utsava Bēram), Ugra Srinivasa (Snāpana Bēram) with consorts and Koluvu Srinivasa (Bali Bēram). Thus the idol of Bhoga Srinivasa should be consecrated directly from the main deity and the Malayappa Swami idol. The order continues downwards to the Ugra Srinivasa idol and finally, the Koluvu Srinivasa idol.

=== Weekly sevas ===
Visesha Puja is performed on Mondays when the 'Chaturdasa kalasa visesha puja' (14 kalasas special puja) is performed to the Lord through the utsava murti. During the Sahasra Kalabhishekam puja, abhishekam is performed to Bhoga Srinivasa, Malayappa swami and Visvaksena.

=== Annual services and festivals ===
During the Teppōtsavam festival, the idol of Malayappa Swami along with his consorts are worshipped in the Swami Pushkarini (The Holy Lake adjoining the temple) when the Lord is taken to a float constructed in the lake and worshipped during Phalguna Pournami. Abhideyaka Abhishekam is performed every year in the month of Jyesta (July) to protect the idols from damage during processions and other events. The festival lasts for three days with the deities adorned Vajrakavacham (armour studded with diamonds), Mutyalakavacham (armour studded with pearls) and svarnakavacham (armour of gold) for these days. During Padmavathi Parainayam celebrated in May, the wedding of Lord Srinivasa and the Goddess Padmavathi is celebrated in the Narayanagiri gardens for three days. During the three days, Malayappa swami arrives on Gaja (Elephant), Asva (Horse) and Garuda (Eagle) vehicles while Sridevi and Bhudevi arrive in separate palanquins. After the Kalyānōtsavam (The commemoration of the weddings of Malayappa Swami), and cultural performances, the idols are taken back to the temple. Pushpa Pallaki festival is celebrated in July at the start of financial year for the lord with the idols taken in procession on a richly decorated floral palanquin.

The idol are taken in procession on various vehicles during the annual Tirumala Brahmotsavam celebrations.
