= List of temples under Tirumala Tirupati Devasthanams =

Tirumala Tirupati Devasthanams (TTD), headquartered at Tirupati in Andhra Pradesh state of India, is the official trust which managing all the activities of main temple at Tirumala, the Venkateswara Temple, and numerous other temples under TTD in Tirupati, across India and all around the world.

IN 2025, Chief Minister Chandrababu Naidu announced that 5000 temples of Venkateswara in Andra Pradesh (specially in SC/ST/BC colonies which are targeted for conversion to other non-Hindu religions) and many more temples across others states and union territories of India and overseas will be constructed under TTD trust.

== Andhra Pradesh ==
=== Historical Temples in Tirupati City ===
Located in different areas of city

- Alipiri
  - Alipiri padala mandapam
- Appalayagunta
  - Sri Prasanna Venkateswara Swamy Temple
- Chandragiri
  - Sri Kodandarama Swamy Temple
- Kapilatheertham
  - Kapila Theertham
- Perur
  - Vakula Matha Temple
- Srinivasamangapuram
  - Sri Kalyana Venkateswara Swamy Temple
- Thondamanadu
  - Sri Bhu Sameta Sri Venkateswara Swamy Temple
- Tiruchanur
  - Sri Padmavathi Ammavari Temple
  - Sri Srinivasa Temple
  - Sri Surya Narayana Temple
- Tirumala
  - Anjanadri, Tirumala
  - Japali Sri Anjaneya Swamy Temple
  - Varahaswamy Temple
  - Venkateswara Temple
- City center
  - Sri Govindaraja Swamy Temple
  - Sri Kodanda Rama Swamy Temple

=== Historical Temples in Andhra Pradesh ===
- Anakapalle district
  - Sri Venugopala Swami Temple, Upamaka
- Annamayya district
  - Lakshmi Narasimha Temple, Tarigonda
  - Siddeswara Temple, Thallapaka
  - Chennakesava Temple, Thallapaka
- Chittoor district
  - Venugopalaswamy Temple, Karvetinagaram
  - Sri Pattabhirama Temple, Valmikipuram
  - Kariyamanikya Temple, Nagari
  - Karivaradaraja Temple, Satravada
  - Annapurna sametha Kashi Visweswara Temple, Buggaagraharam
  - Prasanna Venkateswara Temple, Kosuvaripalle
  - Konetirayala Temple, Keelapatla
- Eluru district
  - Seetharamaswamy Temple, Saripalli
- Guntur district
  - Sri Venkateswara Temple, Ananthavaram
  - Sri Venkateswara Temple, Amaravati
- Kadapa district
  - Kodandarama Temple, Vontimitta
  - Veeranjaneya Temple, Gandi
  - Narapura Venkateswara Temple, Jammalamadugu
  - Lakshmi Venkateswara Temple, Devunigadapa
- Kakinada district
  - Padmavathi sametha Venkateswara Temple, Pithapuram
- Prakasam district
  - Kondanda Ramalayam, Muppavaram
- Tirupati district
  - Kalyana Venkateswara Temple, Narayanavanam
  - Vedanarayana Temple, Nagalapuram
  - Avanakshamma Temple, Narayanavanam
  - Karimanikyaswamy Temple, Tummuru
  - Neelakantheswara Temple, Tummuru
- Visakhapatnam district
  - Visakhapatnam temple

== India ==
- Delhi
  - Sri Venkateswara Temple
- Haryana
  - Kurukshetra
- Jammu & Kashmir
  - Jammu
- Karnataka
  - Bengaluru
- Maharashtra
  - Mumbai
- Odisha
  - Bhubaneshwar
- Tamil Nadu
  - Old temple, Chennai
  - Sri Padmavathi Devi Temple, Chennai.
  - Kanyakumari
  - Ulundurpet
  - Vellore
- Telangana
  - Hyderabad
  - Khammam
- Uttarakhand
  - Tirumala Tirupati Devasthanams Andhra Ashram, Rishikesh.
- Gujarat
  - Tirumala Tirupati Devasthanams Ahmedabad, Ahmedabad.

== Overseas ==
- USA
  - Sri Venkateswara Temple of Central Ohio, Delaware, Ohio

== See also ==
- Lists of Hindu temples
- Parikrama
- Yatra

== General references ==
- Tirumala Tirupati Devasthanams->Temples. "Tirumala Tirupati Devasthanams"
