= Manavala Mamunigal =

Hindu theologian

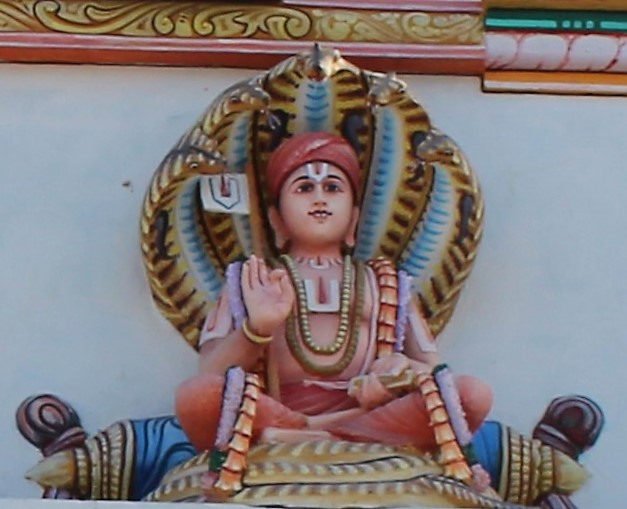
- Statue of the theologian

Personal life
- Born: Alagiya Manavalan; 1370 CE Alwarthirunagari, (now) Thiruggurukoor (old), Tamilakam
- Resting place: Tamil Nadu, India
- Other names: Varavaramuni; Sowmyajamatrumuni; Ramyajamatra Muni; Soumyopayanthrumuni; Sundarajamatrumuni; Periya Jeer; Yathindra Pravanar

Religious life
- Religion: Hinduism
- Denomination: Sri Vaishnavism
- Philosophy: Vishishtadvaita

Azhagiya Manavalan (Tamil: அழகிய மனவாளன்), best known by his epithet Manavala Mamunigal (Tamil: மனவால மாமுனிகள்) lit. 'The great saint, Manavalan' (1370–1450), was a Hindu theologian. He was a major proponent of the Sri Vaishnavism tradition in the 15th century in Tamilakam, disseminating it with the help of his eight disciples. The disciples of Manavalan established places of learning to teach the Vishishtadvaita philosophy in Tamilakam.

Yathindra Pravana Prabhavam by Pillai Lokam Jeeyar is the earliest work on which scholars and historians rely for information for the biography of Manavala Mamunigal.

== Life ==
Manavala Mamunigal was born in 1370 at Alwarthirunagari in Tamil Nadu. His parents were Tigalakidanthan Tirunaveerudaiya Piran Tadar Annar and Sriranga Nachiyar. His father was the son-in-law and also a disciple of Kollikavala Dasar, a junior disciple of Pillai Lokacharya. His parents named him Alagiya Manavalan (beautiful groom) after the deity Ranganathaswamy of Srirangam.

Manavalan was schooled by father and maternal grandfather, who taught him the Vedas, Vedanta, and the Naalayira Divya Prabandam. He married at the age of 16, and moved from Sikkil Kidaram to Alwarthirunagari to become the disciple of the acharya Tiruvaymolipillai.

Tiruvaymolipillai was instrumental in reviving the archa tirumeni (idol) of Ramanuja at Alwarthirunagari and in building a temple for him. He put the young Manavalan in charge of the temple and gave him to title of Yatheendra Pravana in recognition of his devotion to Ramanuja. It was around this time that Manavalan wrote Yathiraja Vimsati, which is considered to be the very essence of the exalted Ramanuja Nutrantati.

=== Journey towards Srirangam ===
On his deathbed, Tiruvaymolipillai instructed Manavalan to learn and propagate the Sri Bhasya, and to spend most of his time in propagating and preaching the arulicheyal (Divya Prabhandam) of the Alvars. He also asked Manavalan to stay at Srirangam and perform service to Ranganatha, as his predecessors had done.

Manavalan was inconsolable upon the death of his master. He immersed himself completely into studying and delivering discourses on Divya Prabandham, and rahasyas. Word of his abilities spread and he gained various disciples. Prominent among them was Sri Alagiya Varadar, who undertook sanyasashrama (asceticism) from Manavalan. The sanyasa name was given as "Ramanuja Jeeyar" (also known as Ponnadikkal Jeeyar). Thus began the most illustrious jeeyar matha in the Sri Vaishnava sampradaya, the Vanamamalai matha, that continues the great unbroken lineage of acharyas to this day.

Intending to fulfil the wishes of his acharya, Manavalan and his disciples left for Srirangam, spending some time at Srivilliputhur, the birthplace of Andal, on their journey.

=== Life at Srirangam and visit to Kanchipuram ===
Srirangam, at that point, was facing the worst consequences of the Muslim invasion that took place in the early 14th century. It was structurally dilapidated, sacramentally bare, intellectually barren and spiritually, socially and morally corrupt. Misuse of rights, corruption and disorder were rampant. Manavalan had to exert tremendous effort and bring to force his organizational skills to restore the original pristine glory for daily sacramental and festival procedures at Srirangam, without antagonizing the people who were functioning in different capacities at that point in time. He realized the importance of bringing the focus back to the essential tenets of Sri Vaishnavism and achieved this objective by bringing to fore scholarly works of acharyas, that had hitherto been pushed into the background. As a result of his devotion, Manavalan was put in charge of everyday temple administration, as well as anointed the leader for all the Sri Vaishnavas of his time.

With normalcy returning to Srirangam, Manavalan set on a pilgrimage to Kanchipuram, Tirumala, and Sriperumbudur, after seeking the blessings of Ranganatha. Manavalan paid his obeisance to Srinivasa at Tirumala, and reached Kanchipuram. At the request of his disciples to glorify the form of Vishnu at Kanchipuram, he composed the Devaraja Mangalam, which praises the glory of Varadharaja in thirteen verses. At Sriperumbudur, Manavalan worshipped Ramanuja, and sought his blessings to formally study Sri Bhasya under an acharya. Ramanuja directed him to Kidambi Nayanar, a descendant of Kidambi Achan (direct disciple of Ramanujacharya). Manavalan exhibited his erudition and scholarship by grasping the intricacies of Sri Bhasya deftly, and then simultaneously expounding it to other disciples. The discourse took place at Yathothkari temple at Tiruvekkaa, where his idol is seen showing the vyakhyana mudra (the teaching gesture) to commemorate this event.

After visiting several other holy places, Manavalan returned to Srirangam to fully manage the temple affairs. He undertook sanyasashrama (asceticism) from Sri Sadagopa Jeeyar (sa brahmachari, also a sishya of Tiruvaimozhippillai) of Alwarthirunagari Permual Temple, however his acharya (pancha-samaskaaram acharya) was Thiruvaaymozhi pillai. It was during this time that he received the appellation Alagiya Manavala Mamuni.

At this point of time, some prominent scholars, namely, Koil Kanthatai Annan, Prathivadhi Bhayankaram Annan(composer of Venkateswara and Naiyanacharya mangalam/suprabhatam), Erumbi Appa, and Appillai became his disciples.

== Philosophy ==
Manavala Mamunigal continued to live in Srirangam, and involved himself completely in writing commentaries for works of Pillai Lokacharya. He wrote elaborate commentaries for three of Pillai Lokacharya's rahasya granthas (secret texts), namely Mumukshupadi, Sri Vachana Bhushanam, and Thathvathrayam. He also wrote commentaries on the works of swami Arulala Perumal Emperumanar - Gnana Saram and Prameya Saram. He penned commentaries on some decads of Periyalvar Tirumoli, for which the original commentaries of Periyavaccan Pillai were supposed to be lost. In addition, he provided the gist of Nammalvar's Tiruvaymoli in the form of poetic verses tuned in the antati metre in his magnum opus, Tiruvaymoli Nutrantati. Manavalan extolled the greatness of the Alvars and the acharyas who wrote commentaries on Tiruvaymoli in his Upadesa Ratnamalai, or the gem-studded garland of instructions. His swansong, Arti Prabandham - a work composed out of utter despair at having to live in this material world - bears resemblance in part to his earlier Sanskrit work titled Yatiraja Vimsati.

After some time, he returned to Alwartirunagari and started to write commentaries for Acharya Hrudayam. This is a seminal work written by Alagiya Manavalaperumal Manavalan (Pillai Lokacharya's brother), which lays bare the philosophy and basic tenets of Sri Vaishnavism, with words chosen from Nammalvar's Tiruvaymoli. The text was written completely in Manipravalam, but when trying to teach Acharya Hrudayam, Mamunigal encountered some difficulties. So, he decided to consult with Ayee Jananyacharya, who was a co-disciple of Tiruyaymolipillai. Ayee was on his way to Alwartirunagari to meet Manavalan. They both met at the outskirts of Alwartirunagari and returned to Manavalan's residence, and the latter studied the secrets of the Acharya Hrudayam.

== Literature ==
Manavala Mamunigal wrote nineteen books known as grantha. Three of these were in Sanskrit, and the rest were in the Tamil language and Manipravalam.

=== Commentaries ===
1. Sri Vachana Bhushanam
2. Mumukshuppadi
3. Tathvathrayam
4. Acharya Hrudhayam
5. Gnana Saram
6. Prameya Saaram
7. Periyalvar Tirumoli
8. Ramanuja Nutrantati
9. Bhagavad Gita (known as Gita Tatparyadipika) - Kanchi Sri Bhayankaram Annangaracharyar Swami lists this commentary in his Sri Manavala Mamunigal Vaibhavam book (1971) as a work of Swami Manavala Mamunigal, but also says it is lost forever.

=== Compilations ===
==== Pramana Tirattu ====
1. Eedu
2. Sri Vachana Bhushanam
3. Tathvathrayam

=== Independent works ===
1. Upadesa Ratnamalai
2. Tiruvaymoli Nutrantati
3. Iyal Satthu
4. Thiruvaradhana Kramam (known as Jeeyar Padi or Nityam)
5. Yathiraja Vimsathi
6. Devaraja Mangalam
7. Sri Kanchi Devapperumal Stotram
8. Arti Prabhandham
9. Independent quatrains on the Vishnu Temples of Kanchipuram, the various sanctums of the Kanchi Varadaraja Temple, and the Vishnu Temples around the birthplace of Nammalvar, Alwartirunagari.

According to tradition, during his old age, Manavalan discovered that part of Periyavachan Pillai's commentary on Periyalvar Tirumoli was missing. So, he duly restored the lost portion of the commentary. It is also noted that he composed the commentary on Acharya Hrdayam with great difficulty, as his health was failing. When he became very ill, preventing him from worshiping at the temple, he dedicated one Tamil stanza a day, expressing to Ramanuja his anguish at staying in this world, and his eagerness to reach Vaikuntham. These collected verses became known as Arti Prabandham, his last work.

== Burial site ==
Manavala Mamunigal's burial site, called the Tiruvarasu in Tamil, is located along the Kollidam Flood Bank Road in Srirangam, Tamil Nadu, India.

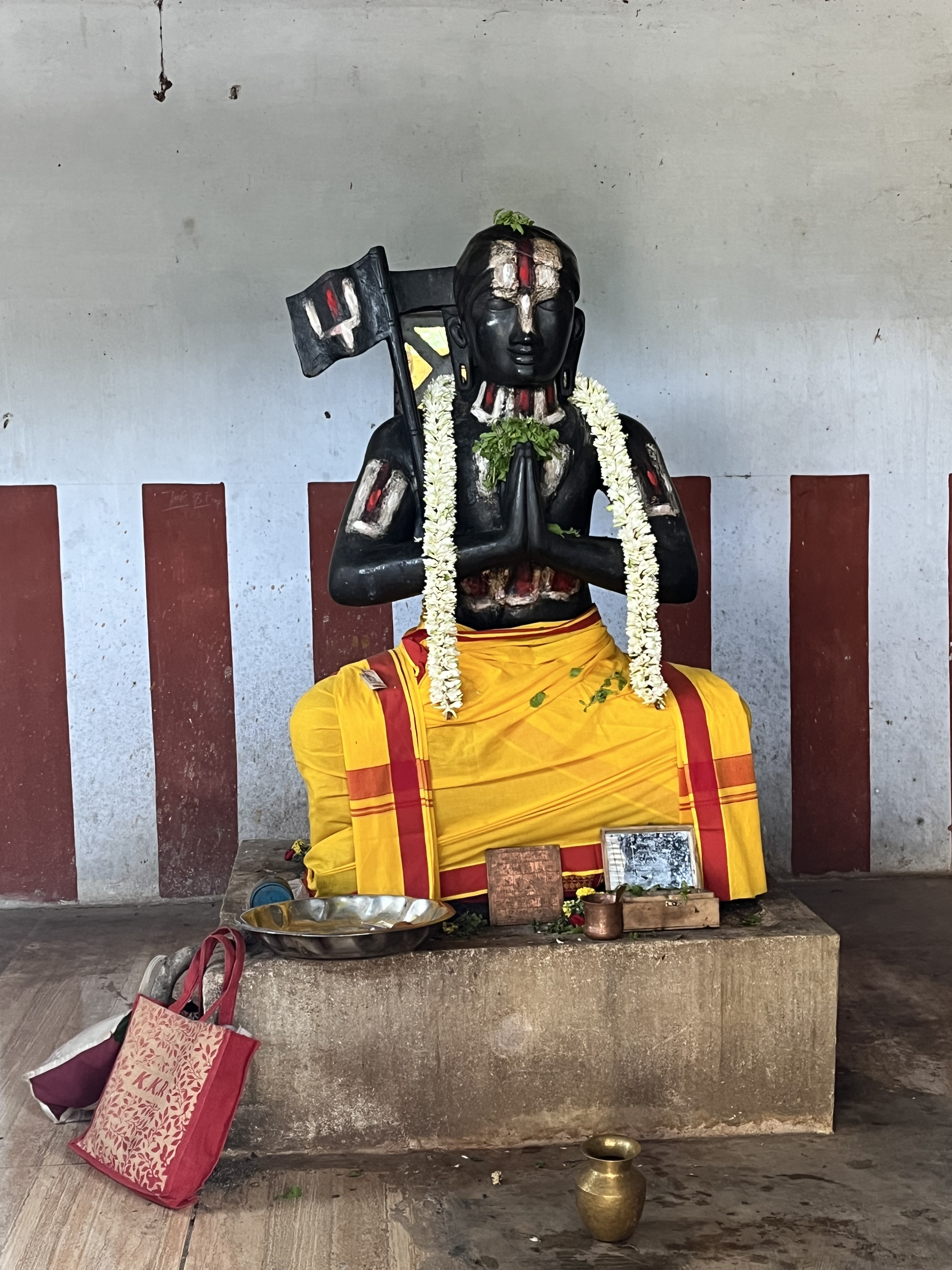
Murti of Manavala Mamunigal near his burial site in Srirangam

Archaeological and radar surveys in the Tiruvarasu area yielded conclusive evidence of his burial site along with locations of temples destroyed during invasions prior to his time period.

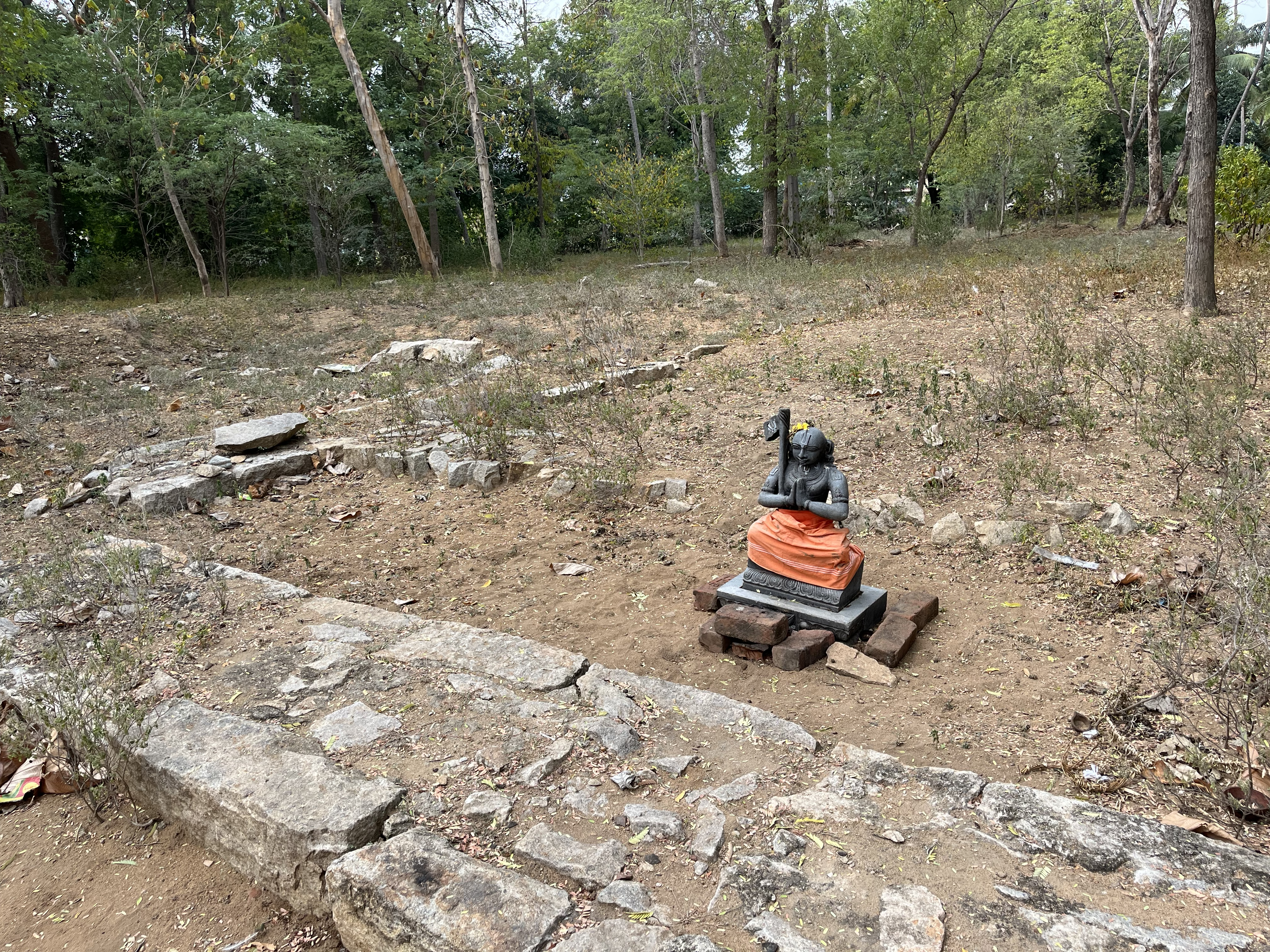
Manavala Mamunigal's burial site

== Legacy ==
Manavalan's devotional practices towards Vishnu, especially the presiding deity of Srirangam, and the lineage of teachers like Ramanuja, left an indelible influence on his followers, numbering several millions throughout India. His influence can be traced to everyday observances till this date.

His eight famous disciples are known as Ashtadiggajas (elephants of the eight directions): Vanamamalai Jeeyar, Paravasthu Bhattar Piran Jeeyar, Tiruvengada Jeeyar, Koil Kandhaadai Annan, Prathivadhi Bhayankaram Annan, Erumbi Appaa, Appillai, and Appillan. Prathivadhi Bhayankaram Annan's Sri Venkateswara Suprabhatham is widely known. In that work and in the connected prapatti and mangala stotras he refers to the "God of the Seven Hills" as residing in the heart of Manavala Mamunigal. The teacher-disciple tradition has been followed for over six centuries and exists intact today amongst 74 simhasana adipatis.

The traditional Sri Vaishnava mathas at Srirangam, Tirumala, Kanchi, Melkote, Vanamamalai, Sriperumbudur, Alwarthirunagari, Srivilliputthur, and descendants of most of the Acharya Purushas follow and propagate Manavala Mamunigal's teachings. The Vijayanagara kings and Nayak kings patronized Sri Vaishnavism, inspired by the teachings of Manavala Mamunigal, and his disciples.

The taniyan or vandana slokam (eulogy) of Manavala Mamunigal, "Sri Sailesa dayapattram", is chanted across Sri Vaishnava temples, including Tirumala, Srirangam, Kanchi, Melkote, Yadadri (Telangana), and many more across India and abroad.

== See also ==
Vedanta Desika
