= Dwaraka Tirumala mandal =

- Mandal
- Interactive map of Dwaraka Tirumala mandal
- Location in Andhra Pradesh, India
- Coordinates: 16.57°N 81.15°E
- Country: India
- State: Andhra Pradesh
- District: Eluru
- Headquarters: Dwaraka Tirumala

Government
  - Body: Mandal Parishad

Area
  - Total: 250.35 km^{2} (96.66 sq mi)

Population (2011)
  - Total: 68,989
  - Density: 275.57/km^{2} (713.72/sq mi)

Languages
  - Official: Telugu
- Time zone: UTC+5:30 (IST)

Dwaraka Tirumala mandal is one of the 28 mandals in Eluru district of the Indian state of Andhra Pradesh. It is under the administration of Eluru revenue division, and the headquarters are located at Dwaraka Tirumala. The mandal is bounded by Jangareddygudem, Koyyalagudem, Kamavarapukota, Nallajerla, Pedavegi, Unguturu, Denduluru and Bhimadole mandals.

== Demographics ==
As of 2011 census, the mandal had a population of 68,989 with 19,180 households. The total population constitute, 34,797 males and 34,192 females —a sex ratio of 983 females per 1000 males. 7,260 children are in the age group of 0–6 years, of which 3,642 are boys and 3,618 are girls. The literacy rate stands at 61.41 with 42,364 literates.

The mandal has the least urban area of 2.18 km^{2} (0.84 sq mi) and the least urban population of 5543 in Dwaraka Tirumala town of all the mandals in West Godavari district.

== Government and politics ==
Dwaraka Tirumala mandal is one of the 4 mandals under Gopalapuram (SC) (Assembly constituency), which in turn represents Rajahmundry (Lok Sabha constituency) of Andhra Pradesh.

== Towns and villages ==
As of 2011 census of India, the mandal has 35 settlements, which includes 1 towns and 34 villages. Dwaraka tirumala (C.T.) is the only town.

The settlements in the mandal are listed below:

1. Chelikanivanipothepalle
2. Dadavalli
3. Dorasanipadu
4. Dwaraka Tirumala (CT) †
5. G.Kothapalle
6. Gollavadi Kunta
7. Gopikunta Khandrika
8. Gundugolanukunta
9. Gunnampalle
10. Havelilingapalem
11. I.S.Jagannadhapuram
12. I.S.Raghavapuram
13. Jajulakunta
14. Khandrika
15. Kodigudem
16. Kommara (North)
17. Kommara (South)
18. Kommugudem
19. Krishnapuram
20. Lingaraopalem
21. M.Nagulapalle
22. Malasanikunta
23. Malleswaram
24. Narayanapuram
25. P.Kannapuram
26. Pangidigudem
27. Rallakunta
28. Ramannagudem
29. Sarabhapuram
30. Sathenagudem
31. Sattala
32. Takkellapadu
33. Thimmapuram
34. Tirumalampalem
35. Vempadu
36. Venkatakrishnapuram

Notes
(CT) denotes a Census town
(†) Mandal headquarter
