= Konetirayala Temple, Keelapatla =

Hindu temple in India

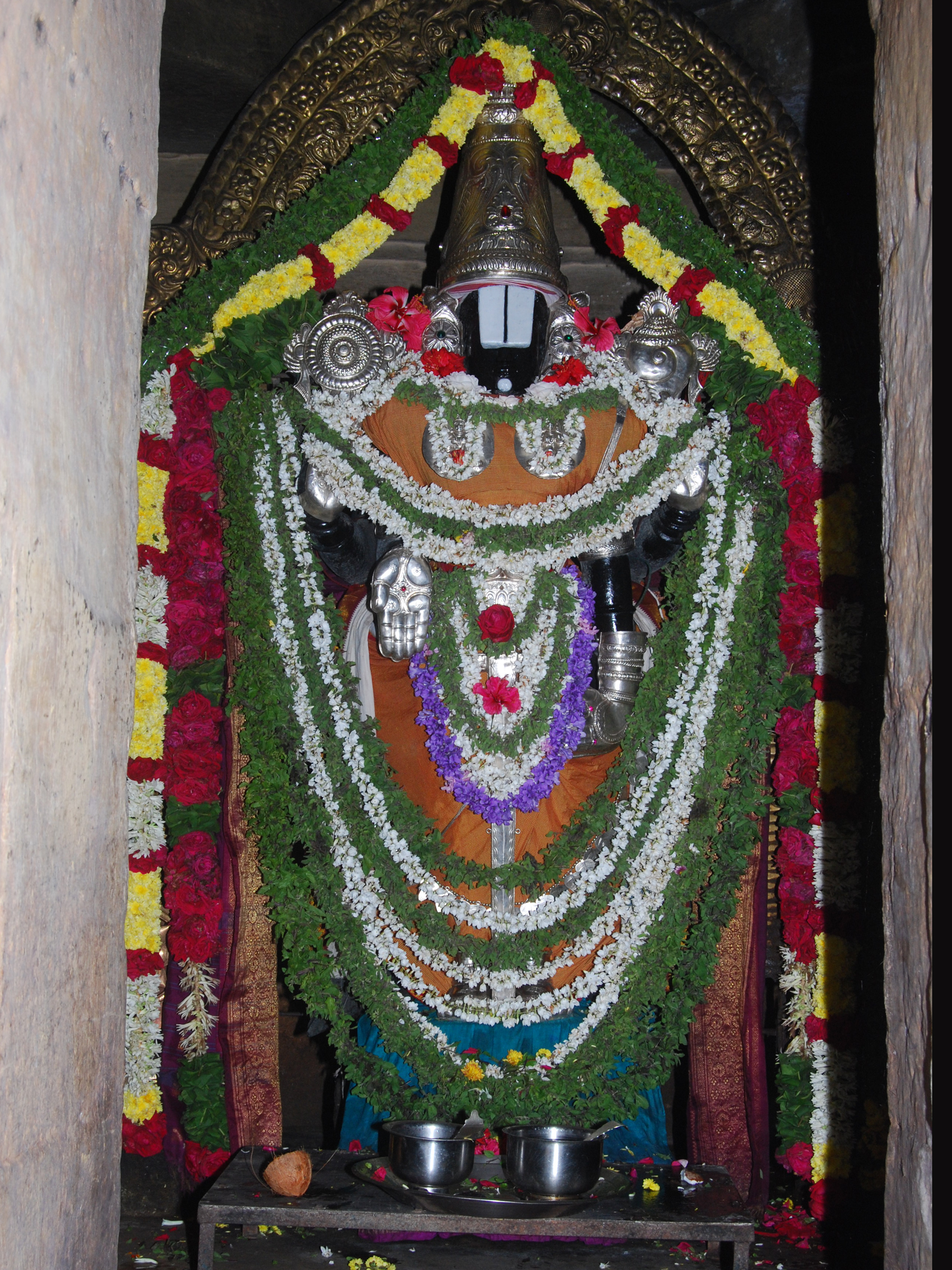
- Sri KonetirayaSwamy, presiding deity of the temple

- Location in Andhra Pradesh

Religion
- Affiliation: Hinduism
- District: Chittoor
- Deity: Venkateswara as Konetiraya
- Festivals: Brahmotsavam, Vaikunta Ekadasi, Ratha Saptami
- Governing body: Tirumala Tirupati Devasthanams

Location
- Location: Keelaptla
- State: Andhra Pradesh
- Country: India
- Interactive map of Konetirayala Temple, Keelapatla
- Coordinates: 13°14′16.5″N 78°46′21.5″E

Architecture
- Type: Dravidian architecture
- Temple: 1
- Inscriptions: Dravidian languages and Sanskrit

Website
- tirumala.org

Konetirayala Swamy Temple (also known as Venkateswara Temple) is a Hindu temple of Lord Venkateswara in the town of Keelapatla, Palamaner, Chittoor District, Andhra Pradesh, India.

Distance: from Bangalore: 141 km, from Tirupati: 120 km, from Hyderabad: 471 km, from Chennai: 203 km

== Legend ==
It is believed that Lord Venkateswara first placed his Holy Foot here at Keelapatla and then reached Tirumala. The Myth believes that Saint Brughu kicked Lord Vishnu's chest and to eradicate such a sin, the Lord sent him to Earth and had him establish the Lord's idol in 7 different places. Some of these places are: 1. Dwaraka Tirupathi, near Vijayawada, Andhra Pradesh 2. Kalyana Venkateshwara Swamy, Srinivasa Mangapuram, Andhra Pradesh 3. Konetiraya Swamy, Keelapatla, Andhra Pradesh 4. Diguva Tirupathi, Mulbagal, Karnataka etc..,

These places were hidden and the saint himself who went into disappearance by his mystical powers, were established much before the Lord himself came to the Earth. After Lords arrival, Brughu came into existence with Agasthya Maharshi, the mystical powers which hid these places were removed and they came into visible light of the common man. The idols were all under trees. The ruling kings then came forward to build temples around these idols.

== History ==
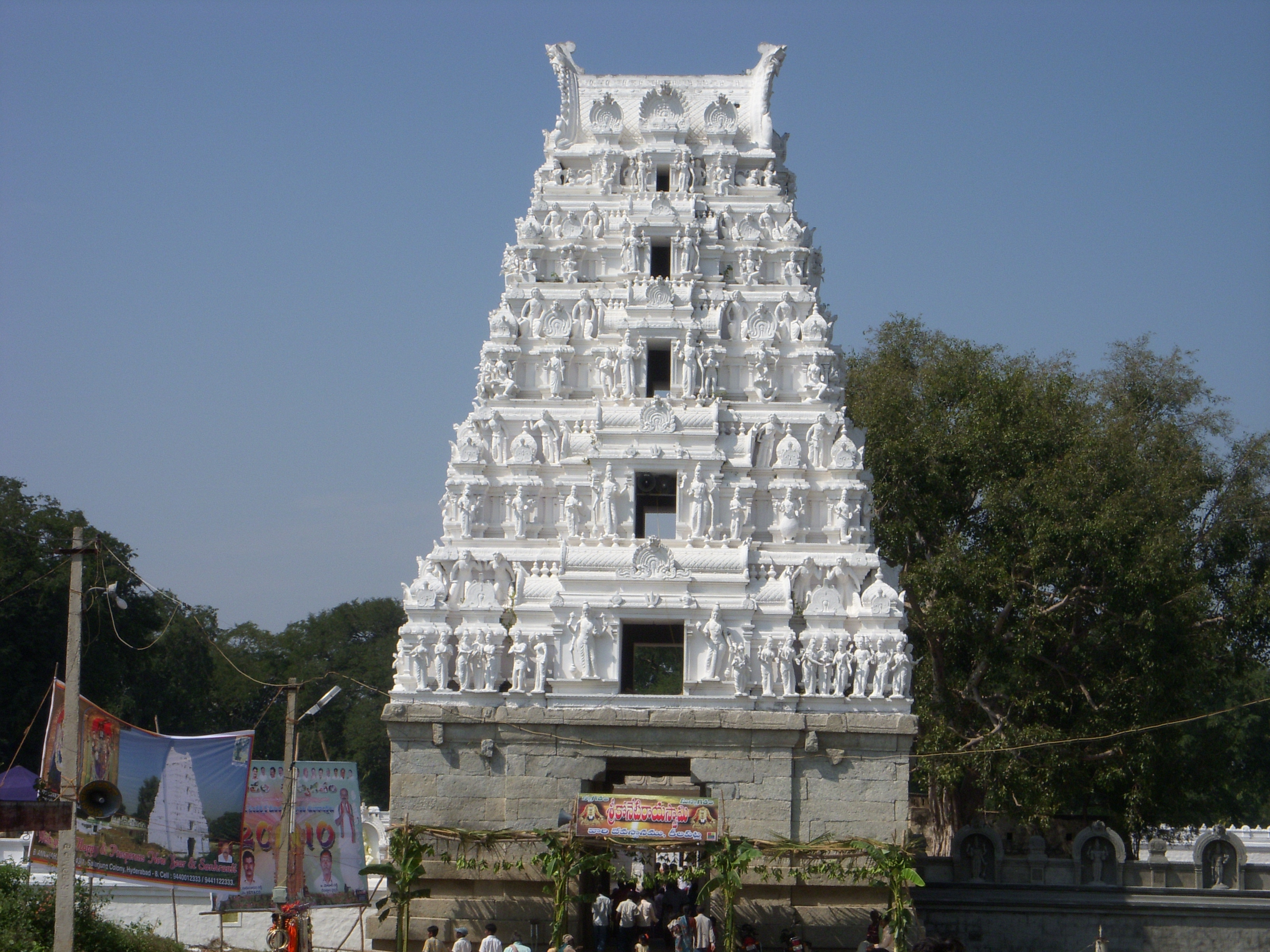
Main Gopuram at Keelapatla Temple

History says some of the rulers who ruled this place were, Sathavahans, Pallavas, Renuti Cholas, Rastrakootas, Banus, Chalukyas, Pandyas, Yadava Kings, Vijayanagar Emperors, Matli Kings, Moghul Kings, Arcot Nawabs, Tippu Sultan, Britishers and Palegars. The 15th-century Hindu saint, Andhra Pada kavitā Pitāmaha, Annamacharya mentions the name of Konetiraya in many of his sankeerthanas. "In past the temple was developed by Punganuru 'Jamindars', They were coming to the temple by punganoru-kallupalli-malleru-melumoi-kothapalli-keelapatla wise road. We don’t follow this route as it is still a soil road and not moterable. In Melumoi which is nearby were found a lot of copper coins of Punganur Jamindar's. Even Muslims worship Lord Sri Venkateswara as their beloved and Punganuru Samasthanam Jamindars who were Muslims had improved this temple."

== Deities in the temple ==
Lord Venkateswara who is referred to as Konetirayudu is the primary presiding deity of the temple. The deity is believed to be Kalpatharu (a heavenly tree that gives boon), Chintamani (a celestial power) and Kamadhenu (the heavenly cow that gives all). In the sanctum of the temple, Konetirayadu like in Tirumala, is in standing posture with his "Kati Varada Hastas", natural "Sankhu Chakras" and with the impressions of Sridevi and Bhudevi, on the chest. Huge Jaya-Vijayas (watchmen at the gate of the Lord's Place), an ancient Chennakesava idol with his two wives, five Alwars, Bhoovaraha Moorthy, Garudalwar, Anjaneya Swamy statues, all can be seen in the temple.

== Administration ==
The temple at present is being administered by Tirumala Tirupati Devasthanams board.

== See also ==
- List of temples under Tirumala Tirupati Devasthanams
