= Venkatesh Mandir, Kathmandu =

Hindu temple in Kathmandu, Nepal

Coordinates: 27.70608°N 85.34324°E

Venkatesh Mandir (Devasthan) is a Hindu mandir located in Gaushala, Batttisputali Kathmandu, Nepal. It resembles the Lord Tirupati Balaji of India.

== Location ==
Venkatesh Mandir (Devasthan) is located at Gaushala in Kathmandu. It is near the holy pilgrimage Pashupatinath and Gaushala chowk.

== Introduction ==
This temple is one of the oldest Vaishnav temples of Nepal. It is run by the help of devotees.

== History ==
Legend states that in 1898 C.E. Vaikuntha wasi Srimati Garudhwaj Ramanuja Dasi "aafuaama" and her husband Govindacharya made a pilgrimage to Tirumala Venkateswara Temple in India, returning to Nepal with a small statue of Balaji (also known as Venkateswara, a manifestation of the Hindu Vishnu). Temple management states that other statues were also brought back from other visits.
