= Venkateswara Temple, Dwaraka Tirumala =

Hindu temple in India

Sri Venkateswara Temple, Dwaraka Tirumala
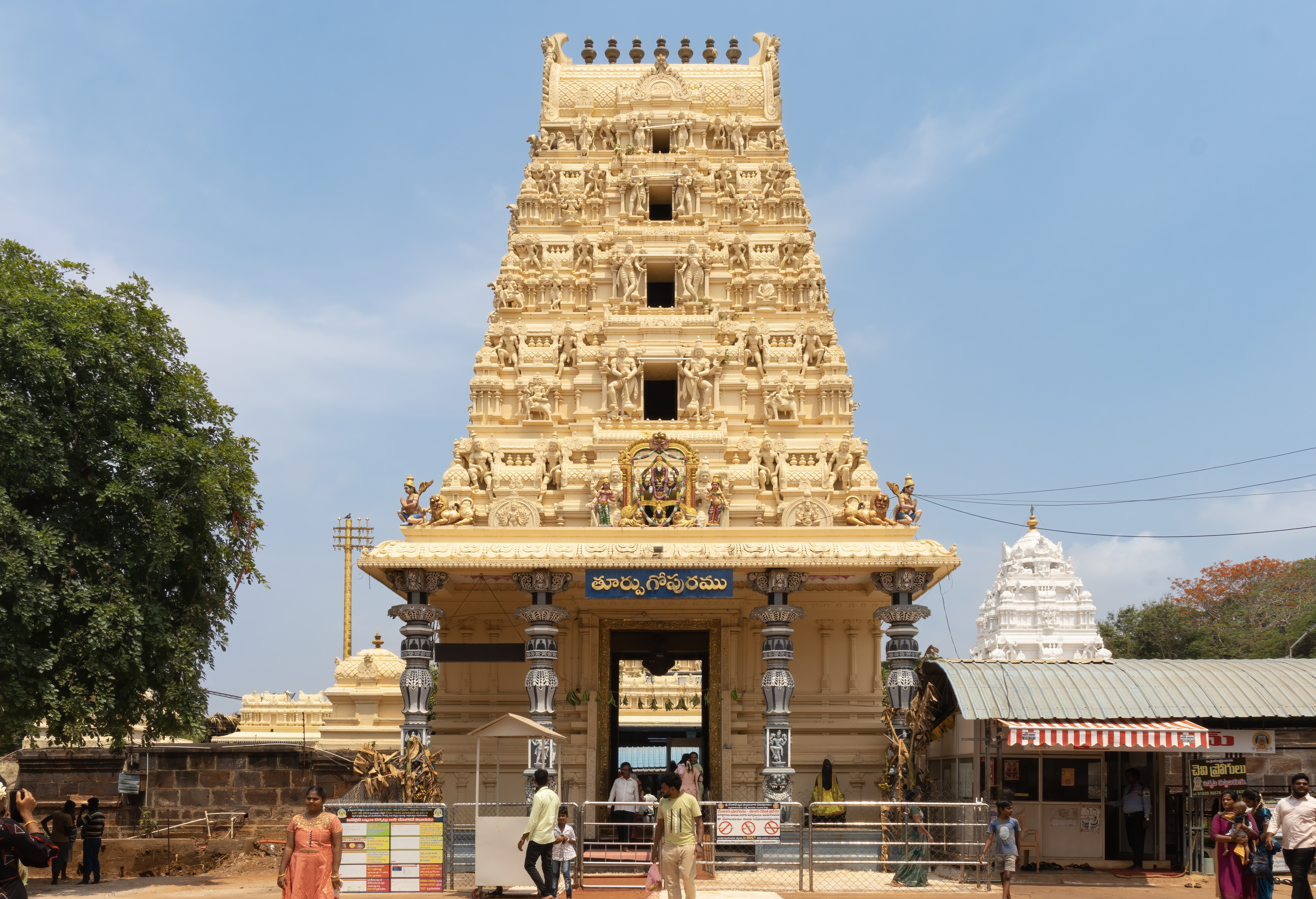
- Gopuram of Dwaraka Tirumala temple

- Location in Andhra Pradesh

Religion
- Affiliation: Hinduism
- District: Eluru
- Deity: Venkateswara (Vishnu)
- Festivals: Tiru Kalyanotsavam, Radhotsavam, Pavithrotsavam
- Governing body: Sri Venkateswara Swami Vari Devasthanam

Location
- Location: Dwaraka Tirumala
- State: Andhra Pradesh
- Country: India
- Interactive map of Sri Venkateswara Temple, Dwaraka Tirumala
- Coordinates: 16°57′N 81°16′E

Architecture
- Type: Dravidian architecture

Website
- www.dwarakatirumala.org/home.html

Sri Venkateswara Temple is a Hindu temple located in Dwaraka Tirumala of Eluru district in the Indian state of Andhra Pradesh. It is dedicated to Lord Venkateswara, an incarnation of Lord Vishnu. Known as "Chinna Tirupati" (transl. "Mini Tirupati"), it is considered a spiritual alternative to the famous Tirupati temple. The temple is unique for housing two idols of Lord Venkateswara: a self-manifested idol and a second idol installed for complete worship.

The temple's origins are linked to the sage Dwaraka, who is believed to have discovered the idol after intense penance. The temple attracts around 50 lakh devotees annually, with daily pilgrim counts reaching up to 40,000 on auspicious days.

== History ==
The construction of key structures, including the vimana, mantapa, gopura, and prakara is attributed to Dharma Appa Rao (fl. 1762 – c. 1827), a ruler. Additionally, the golden ornaments and silver vahanas at the temple were donated by Rani Chinnamma Rao, the queen of Mylavaram in Krishna District, who reigned from 1877 to 1902. These contributions significantly enhanced the temple's grandeur.

== Legend ==
As per legend, the temple's origins trace back to the great sage Dwaraka, who discovered the self-manifested idol of Lord Venkateswara after intense penance. Dwaraka Maharshi's penance was so intense that a large anthill (Valmikam) formed around him. When the Lord manifested, the lower half of the idol was submerged within the anthill, preventing the customary foot worship (Pada Puja) of the deity. As a solution, a second idol was brought from the main Tirupati temple and placed behind the original idol. This is why the temple at Dwaraka Tirumala houses two deities in its sanctum: the self-manifested idol and the second idol.

According to the Brahma Purana, the region between the Krishna and Godavari rivers, encompassing Dwaraka Tirumala, is considered highly sacred. Pilgrims unable to visit Tirumala often offer prayers and donations here, making it a spiritual alternative to the "Pedda Tirupati" (Tirupati).

The temple's significance is believed to date back to the Satya Yuga and continues to attract devotees. The deity is venerated as the "Vaikunta Vasa of Kali Yuga."

A unique feature of the temple is the presence of two main idols under one Vimana Sikharam: a self-manifested half-statue and a complete statue installed by sages to facilitate complete worship, including the Lord's feet. These idols symbolize moksha and the pursuit of dharma, artha, and kama, respectively.

== Location ==
The temple is located atop Seshachala Hill in Eluru district, Andhra Pradesh. It is located approximately is 42 km from Eluru, 15 km from Bhimadole Junction, and 75 km from Rajahmundry.

== Architecture ==
The temple exhibits exquisite Dravidian architecture, featuring a five-storied Rajagopuram and three smaller gopurams. The sanctum sanctorum houses the deity, visible only up to the bust, with the lower half believed to extend into the earth. The full-sized idol behind it, attributed to Ramanuja, complements the main deity.

Lord Venkateswara in this temple faces south, unlike in most temples where the deity faces east. This is believed to be due to the position of Dwaraka Maharshi, who performed penance facing the north, leading to the manifestation of the deity in the south-facing direction.

Additional shrines within the complex include deities such as Padmavathi, Nanchari, and Anjaneya Swamy, alongside images of Sage Dwaraka and Annamacharya. The temple's hill is mythologically associated with Adisesha, symbolizing a harmonious blend of Vaishnavism and Shaivism.

== Festivals ==
The temple celebrates Tiru Kalyanotsavam twice a year, once in the month of Vaisakha and again in Aswayuja, honouring both the self-manifested and installed idols. Other major events include Giripradakshina (January), Radhotsavam (April and September), and Teppotsavam (November). These festivals attract thousands of devotees annually.

== Rituals ==
Daily rituals commence with Suprabhatam and include offerings such as Nityarjita Kalyanam and Ekanta Seva. Weekly highlights include Swarna Tulasidala Seva on Wednesdays and Snapana Pooja on Fridays. The distribution of prasadam like laddu, pulihora, and appalu is an integral part of temple practices. The rituals performed in the temple as per the Vaikhanasa agama sastra. Devotees often fulfill vows by tonsuring their heads at the Kalyana Katta near the temple, a tradition linked to Neela Devi's sacrifice for Lord Venkateswara.

At Dwaraka Tirumala, Lord Venkateswara does not receive an abhishekam (ritual bath) due to the presence of red ants (Konijulu) in the inner sanctum. These ants emerge from an anthill-like formation under the idol whenever water is poured, as the lower half of the idol remains inside the anthill. To avoid disturbing the ants, the priests refrain from performing the ritual, and the ants are also said to emerge when metal objects are brought into the temple.

== Management and facilities ==
The temple is managed by the Sri Venkateswara Swami Vari Devasthanam board. Facilities include free annaprasadam for thousands of pilgrims daily, a Gosala housing over 300 cows, and well-maintained lodging for devotees. Ongoing development projects aim to enhance infrastructure, including a new annaprasada complex. The temple management also runs various educational institutions and an Ayurveda hospital.

In 2009, the temple's annual gross income was ₹28 crore, with a net income of ₹12 crore. In 2020, the temple was included under the Pilgrimage Rejuvenation and Spiritual Augmentation Drive (PRASAD) scheme, with ₹83.83 crore sanctioned for phased development to enhance amenities and promote religious tourism. In December 2022, the administration declared the temple a tobacco-free zone, banning smoking and tobacco products within the premises and imposing strict penalties for violations.

== Nearby attractions ==
Notable nearby temples within 35 km include:

- Sri Maddi Anjaneya Swamy Temple, Guravaya Gudem
- Sri Seeta Ramachandra Swamy Temple, E. Yadavalli
- Parijata Giri Venkateswara Swamy Temple, Jangareddygudem
