= Sri Venkataramana Temple, Karkala =

Temple in Karnataka, India

Sri Venkataramana Temple
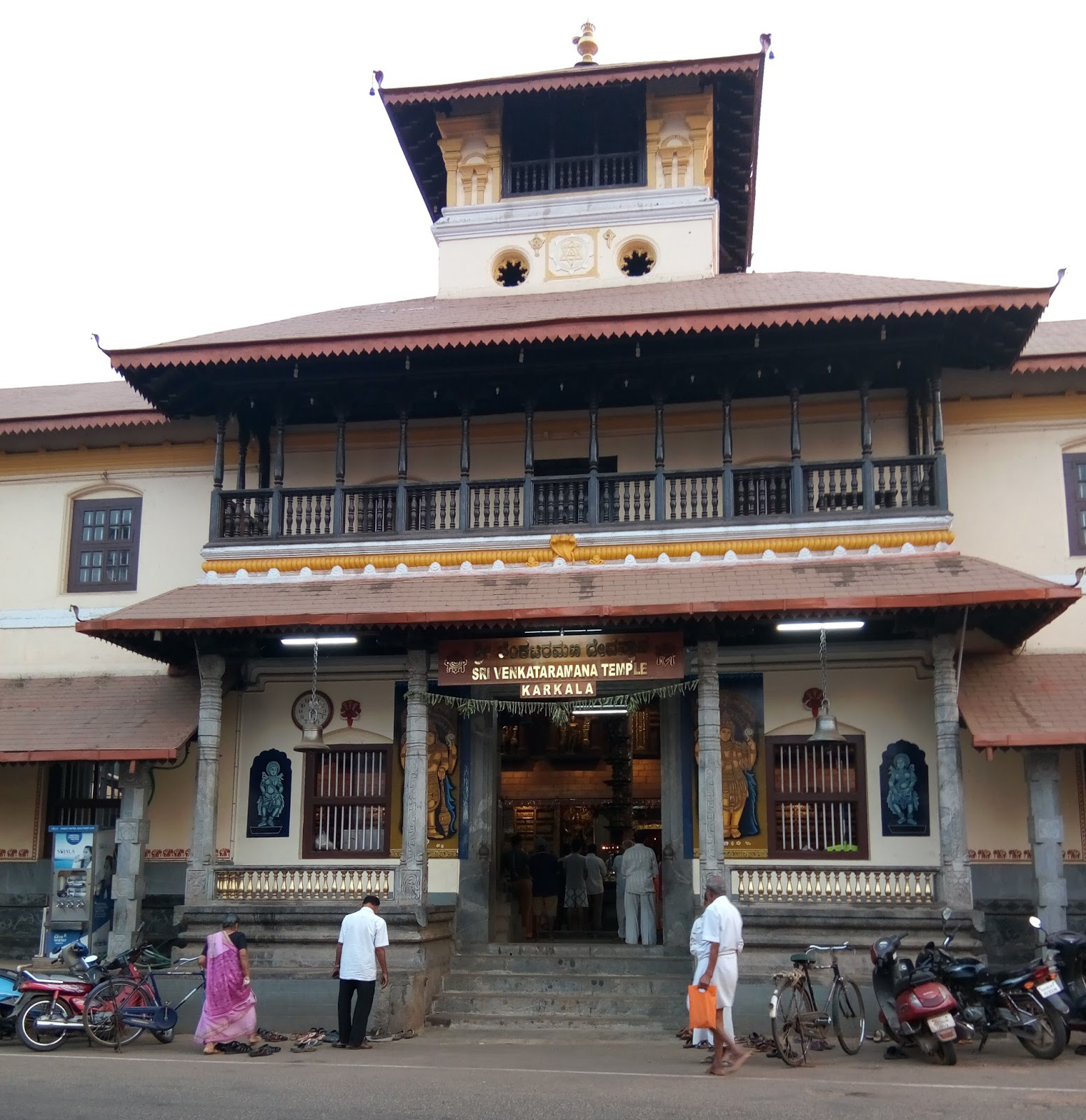
- Main entrance of temple

- Location in Karnataka

Religion
- Affiliation: Hinduism
- District: Udupi District
- Deity: Maha Vishnu
- Festivals: Rathothsava, Laksha Deepothsava

Location
- Location: Karkala
- State: Karnataka
- Country: India
- Interactive map of Sri Venkataramana Temple
- Coordinates: 13°12′56″N 74°59′33″E

Architecture
- Type: Vastu Shastra
- Creator: Goud Saraswat Brahmins
- Completed: mid-14th century
- Temple: 1

Website
- www.svtkarkala.com

Sri Venkataramana Temple, Karkala, also known as Padutirupathi, is a temple in Karnataka, India. It was built by Goud Saraswat Brahmins of Karkala and was installed on 25 April 1537.

== Etymology ==
This shrine lies to the west of Tirupati while original shrine is in the east. The name itself signifies its meaning; Padu means 'West' in Kannada and Tirupathi means Tirumala temple.

== History and origin ==
This ancient temple of Karkala, Karnataka, India was built by Goud Saraswat Brahmins of Karkala. They migrated from Goa after the Portuguese invaded it. Since they could not suffer their tortures, they migrated to places like Karnataka and Kerala, where they brought all their household items.

=== Original installation ===
This temple has a history dating from about the 15th century when the Jain Bhairarasa Odeyars ruled Karkala and surrounding places. The Gaud Saraswat Brahmins were given land by the Jain Odeyars so that these people can lead a happy life. They also gave them lands for agriculture as these Brahmins had it as an occupation. The priests of this community namely; Joishys, Puraniks and Tantris were the main people existed in the 15th century. The exact date of the installation of this temple is still unknown as during that time, there were no written materials or documents.

=== Installation ceremony and its history ===
The main attraction of this temple was its installation ceremony. The Gaud Saraswat Brahmins (GSBs) came to Karnataka in search of food and shelter. They paid a visit to all the places along the coastline. Some of them settled in Karwar, Ankola, Kumta, Bhatkal, Shirali and so on. A few of them went to Kerala and settled in Ernakulam, Cochin, Manjeshwar etc. The rest went to Udupi and Dakshina Kannada (which was previously under Mysore State). These GSBs came and settled in Pandya Nagari of Jains between 1530 AD and 1550 AD (now called Karkala). They brought with them, all of their articles and household items which included the idol of Lord Venkataramana. The first GSB to enter Karkala was Soire Prabhu whose great grandson is K. Ramesh Prabhu the present trustee of the temple. They are also called the first Mokteswar of Karkala Padu Tirupathi Temple. One more family who migrated from Goa along with Prabhu's were the Soma Sharmas. He was a priest in Tirupathi Temple. Prabhus started their lives in Karkala how they used to live in Goa with all the rites and rituals. Their priests joined them.

Some of the GSBs came to this place wandering from place to place for shelter and food. They met the Jain kings, and they told them about Prabhus, Sharmas and GSB priests. They gave these people permission to stay with them. One fine day all these GSBs came to Jain King Immadi Bhairava, asking for land to build a temple for Lord Sree Venkataramana in 1550 AD. The Jain king happily gave them the land for that purpose, along with some black stones which were prevalent in the area. This shows that the Jains patronised other religions. The land which they gave to the GSBs was occupied by a lady of some Mutt (religious institution for learning Vedas and Puranas). The lady heeded to the people and Jains only one condition that

"There are four powerful Ganas [Lord Shiva's servants] who should be worshipped and given sacrifices of coconuts, green pumpkins, Turmeric and so on; or they would get angry. Also a yearly sacrifice should be performed so that no unholy things may happen in and around here."

The Gaud Saraswat Brahmins and the Jain king openly said yes to lady, and the temple was built. Initially a huge platform was built and four pillars were made to stand in the corners. Entangled coconut leaves were made as a roof. The idol was installed inside and prayed for the betterment of people. The compound wall was in its progress for building up the blocks. Soma Sharma returned to Karkala from Tirupathi with another idol of Lord Sree Venkataramana which was given to him by the Tirumala priests at the end of the 14th century. He installed this idol with the previously installed idol of Lord Venkataramana in the newly built stone platform.

During 1500 AD, some dacoits attacked Karkala and started stealing all the gold and silver ornaments and idols. Karkala GSBs got scared about these bad events. They made up their mind and took all their precious articles with the two idols and ran away. They asked the Jain kings to protect their area. The king gave them 100% moral support. Karkala GSBs reached an area called Mulki where threw all the materials they had with them in a well. In Karkala there was a huge fight between Jain rulers and the dacoits. The dacoits had to run away from Karkala since they had been defeated. As the happenings cooled down, Karkala GSBs returned to the well and tried to retrieved all the idols and articles. But they could not retrieve the idol which Soma Sharma had brought with him. They got depressed and returned to Karkala. One morning, a Mulki person was passing near the well and found something shining. He went down and tried to look at it. It was the same idol the Karkala people were searching for. He thought the Lord must have made his mind to stay in Mulki, so he took it and made a plan install it in Sree Veera Vittal Temple of Mulki established by Soira Vittal Bhat.

As soon as Karkala GSBs received this news in few days, they rushed to Mulki. But by that time Mulki people had installed it in the temple. The Karkala GSBs stayed there and slept over. That night the idol (Lord Venkataramana installed at Mulki) appeared in their dream and said

"You all please go to Karkala and stay there, don't get frustrated or depressed because of this event. I will come again to your place and stay there; a Saint from Tirumala Tirupati will be coming to Karkala with me. There will be Sampurna Sannidhi [meaning that the idol would be having powerful grace of Tirupathi] in me. Install it with the idol which you have at present in your temple."

The very next morning they met Mulki residents, told them about the dream, and went back to Karkala with a hope that Tirupathi Sreenivasa would come.

Months passed by while the GSBs waited. One day an old person arrived in Karkala with a bag on his shoulder and dressed as a hermit. He asked for a place to take rest with the Gaud Saraswat Brahmins. They gave him a small place to stay. He had some idol of Lord Vishnu which he used to take with him for a pilgrimage. That night when everyone was in deep sleep a strange dream appeared for the GSBs and the saint. Lord of Tirupathi was the main character in the dream. For GSB's the dream was, "Devotees of mine, I have come over here as I promised. The saint who came to this place has come Tirumala and the idol which he has is mine. You take the idol from him and install it but as per my instructions. During the ceremony a cow and her calf should be left for feeding after pooja. The place where the cow drops her milk after milking the calf will be my sacred place. Do all these things first and then rest leave it to me." For the saint the dream appeared as, "Oh Saint you have travelled much in your life and now its time for you to take rest in your life. I like this place very much and want to stay here for the rest of the time. The people from whom you asked the land are in need of me as I had promised them that I would come from Tirumala Tirupathi and stay in this place. So please hand over me to them." The saint agreed to Lord's wishes and very next morning went to GSB people to hand over the idol with one condition. His condition was,"Any offerings given to Lord almighty would be taken to Tirupathi occasionally and Lord would be taken to Tirupathi once a year." They agreed to hermits condition and installed the idol as per Lord's instructions. This installation was on the day 25 April 1537.

Slowly and steadily the temple got built up with its Garbha Griha (sanctum sanctorum). The whole temple got renovated in 1699–1700. Then Parivar Devas like Lord Mukyaprana, Lord Gaurda, Lord Lakshmi and Lord Ganapathi were installed after two years of renovation. The number of devotees entering this gradually increased due to the divine environment of this place.

The temple was again renovated in the year 2017.

== Rites and rituals ==
Since this temple is related to Tirumala, it follows the same rituals as in Tirupathi Temple. In the morning at 6:00 (in some cases it is 5:30 am during Ashwija month) the temple doors are opened with Dwara Pooja and Suprabhatam. Dwara Pooja is performed for the door keepers Jaya-Vijaya (in Vishnu Loka they represent DwaraPaalakaas).

Suprabhatam is a special slokha recited to wake up the Lord from his sleeps. Then after the end Suprabhata Nirmala Visarjana (removal of old flowers and decoration of new ones to deities) is performed with Ganji Naivedyam (serving of rice and rice item foods, including Navaneetham mixture of butter, til and sugar) at about 6:30 am. At 10:00 am Panchaamrutha abhishekha is performed for the Saligrama. This abhishekha is a typical one as performed in Tirupathi. In Tirumala this is performed on Lord Venkateshwara's stone statue and to honour the same here it is performed on the Saligrama.

At noon Naivedyam is performed wherein several items are served for the Lord in a huge plate and utensil made out of copper. Once the Naivedya is over a little bit of rice is served in small utensils and is kept in front of Parivar Devas while one is offered to Sree Veeramaruthi Temple. After this Maha Puja is performed at 1:00 pm, this is called Raajopchaara Puja. The temple doors are closed after this for Vishrama Seva.

In the evening at about 6:00, temple doors are again opened with lighting of oil lamps. A special shlokha is sung called as "Deevtige Salaam Shlokham." Cassettes of bhajans are played on loudspeakers at this divine time of sunset. At 6:30 people from all over the town come to temple to sing the hymns of Lord Almighties, and this goes on until 8:00 pm.

At 8:00 again Naivedyam is offered with Mangalaarthi. Once Mangalaaarthi finishes, night Utsava is offered. This is usually an outing to the town except on Amavasya and Ekadashi. Once Utsava returns to temple there are five rounds inside; the first one is Vaadya Sutthu (instrumental), second and third is Rigveda and Yajurveda Sutthu, fourth is Sangeetha Sutthu (Yakshagana's Thaala Maddhale) and last one is Sarva Vaadya Sutthu. After the utsav ends with Vasantha Puja (Lord is given Uyaala Seva with recitals of shlokhas) deities are put to sleep which is known as Ekaantha Seva (11:30pm or on festive days depends on time taken).

== Income and economy ==
The income for this temple mainly comes from the Kaanikas (money) given as offering to the Lord by devotees. Also the temple owns houses which are currently offered on rent and few lands which are given on lease, so finances are higher through these resources. Srinivasa Kalyana Mantapa, which is one of the halls built by the temple are rented for cultural programs, weddings, Brahmopadesham and the rent collected also adds to the income. Devotees offer funds towards the temple and some of them give yearly donations while some devotees register for longtime funds.
