= Ayee Jananyacharya =

Hindu Sri Vaishnava religious leader

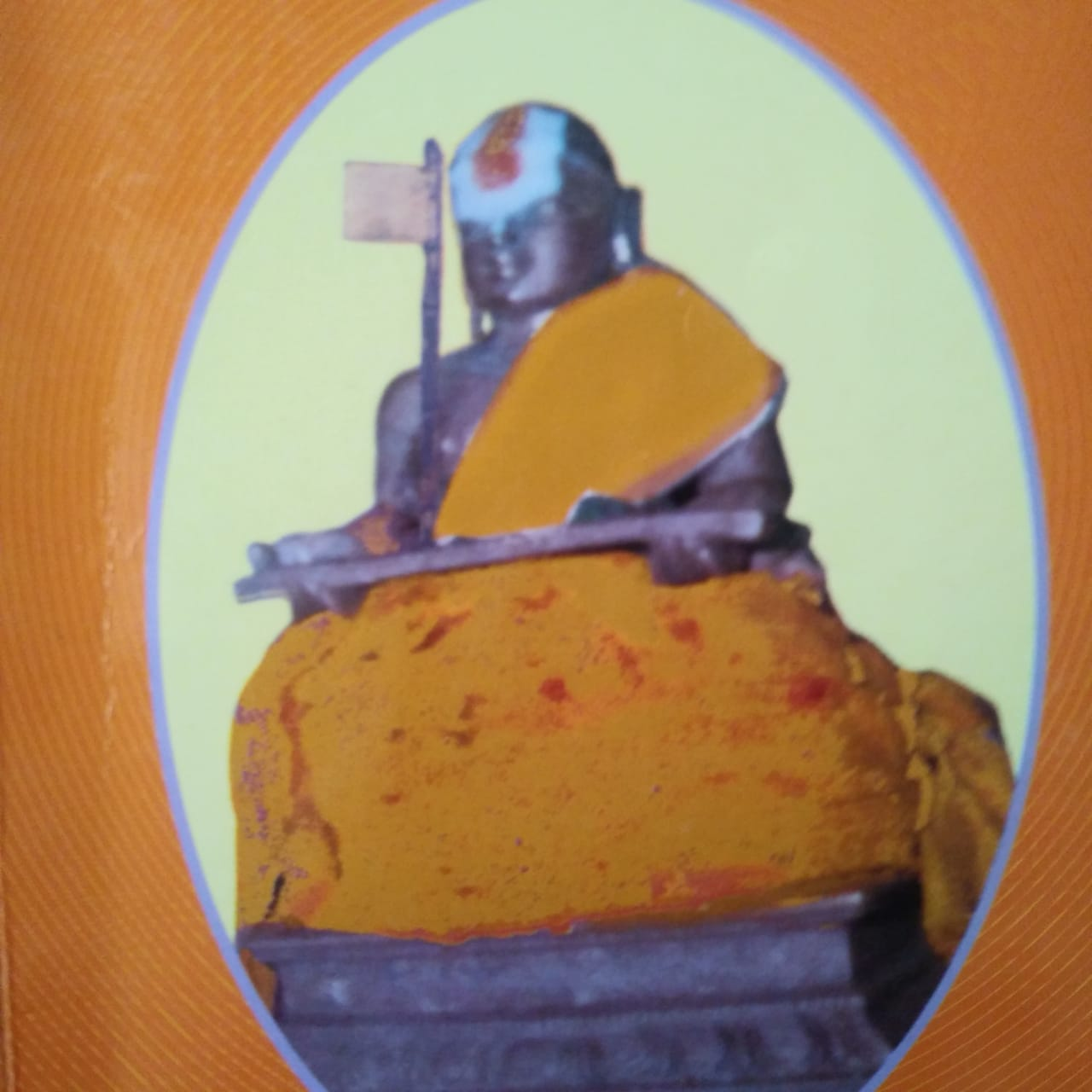

Personal life
- Born: Devarajar c. 1341 CE Melukote, Karnataka, India
- Died: c. 1445 CE Melukote, Karnataka, India
- Notable work(s): Vyakyana(Commentary) on Tiruppavai (2000 padi and 4000 padi), Srivachanabhushana and Āchárya Hrudya, Kurungi Stotram
- Honors: Deshantarathińkan, Táyárther

Religious life
- Religion: Hinduism
- Philosophy: Vishishtadvaita

Ayee Jananyacharya or Devaraja Perumal (1341–1445 CE) was a Hindu Sri Vaishnava religious leader, great saint, and one of the important propagator of the Sri Vaishnavism tradition. Sri Jananyacharya Swami was Seventh in the lineage of Sri Ramanujacharya. He was a scholar in ubhaya vedanta who took Vishishtadvaita school of vedanta to the next level and widely popularized and propagated the Sri Vaishnava tradition.

== Birth and early life ==
Ayee Jananyacharya Swamy was born in 1341 at Melukote in Karnataka to Asuri Lakshmanacharya in the month of Tula Karthika and belongs to the lineage of Harita gotra. As per few hagiographies, the life period is placed as 1341–1445 CE thereby yielding a lifespan of almost 105 years. Ayee swamy got his sacred thread ceremony and pancha samskaram at a very early age and started his education of Veda, vedanga and Divya Prabhandam from his father.

It is believed that Ayee swamy had a strong and tall physique and is always seen wearing 12 Urdhva Pundra. His day-to-day activities consisted of worshipping Thiru Narayanan and Kalyani Varãha swamy (Lord Jnanappiran) followed by herding the cows in a pasture near the present kalyani. Even in his busy schedule, Ayee Swami had scholared the sacred Divya Prabhandam and Vedas and has authored notable commentaries on various Sri vaishnava texts. Ayee swamy in his poorvashrama had a son named Keshavachar.

== Life at Melukote ==
Ayee Swamy lived in Melukote performing the nithya kainkaryam to Lord Shelvapillai, he had a unique and special service of offering the cow milk to the almighty Shelvapillai on daily basis. However one day due to some reason, Ayee swamy was late for his nithya kainkaryam so the temple priest thought of offering Kshira anna itself to the Almighty Shelvapillai as Naivedhya, Immediately there was a divine voice of Thirunarayana "Where is my mother(Ayee)? Please wait till my mother offers me milk". Thus the Lord of Melkote adored him like mother Yashodha, for his devoted service and addressed him as Ayee (Mother), as per legends. Since then, he was called as Ayee Swami or Jananyacharya (Janani Meaning Mother in Sanskrit)

He continued living in Melukote and involved himself completely in writing commentaries for Thiruppavai (2000 padi and 4000 padi), Sri vachana Bushanam and Acharya Hrudayam. He also composed Kurungi Stotra and few padya and gadya (poems and proses) in Tamil and Sanskrit language.

== Meeting Manavala Mamunigal ==
Manavala Mamunigal encountered some difficulties while teaching one of the Rahasya Grantha called Acharya Hrudaya. At the same time, there was an instruction from Lord of Melukote Thirunarayana in the dreams of Ayee Swamy to meet Mamunigal and expound about Acharya Hrudaya. As per the directions of the almighty, Ayee swamy started his journey and on the outskirts of alvar tirunagari where he met Manavala Mamunigal and both greeted each other and discussed in detail about the Acharya Hrudayam. Ayee swamy explained the secrets of Acharya Hrudayam to Mamunigal, post which the Mamunigal adored Ayee Swamy as his acharya and praised him with a Stotram as follows

aacharya hrudayasyarta sakala yena darshitaha
sreesanudasa mamalam devarajam tamaashraye

Translation:

== Literary works ==
Ayee swamy contributed a lot to the Sri Vaishnava literature both in Tamil and Sanskrit. Few notable ones are as follows

=== Commentaries ===
1. Sri Vachana Bhushanam
2. Tiruppavai 2000 padi
3. Tiruppavai 4000 padi
4. Acharya Hrudhayam
5. Periya Thirumozhi
6. Thirumālai

=== Hymns ===
Kurungi panchaka Stotram

== Names ==
1. Devarajar
2. Deva Perumal
3. Asuri Devarayar
4. Thirutazvarai Dasar
5. Srisanudasar
6. Sanudasar
7. Matru Guru
8. Jananyacharyar
9. Ayee
10. Aay
11. Devarajamunindrar

== Disciples ==
1. Manavala Mamunigal
2. Jeeyar Nayanar (grandson on mamunigal)
3. Members of Ayee dynasty

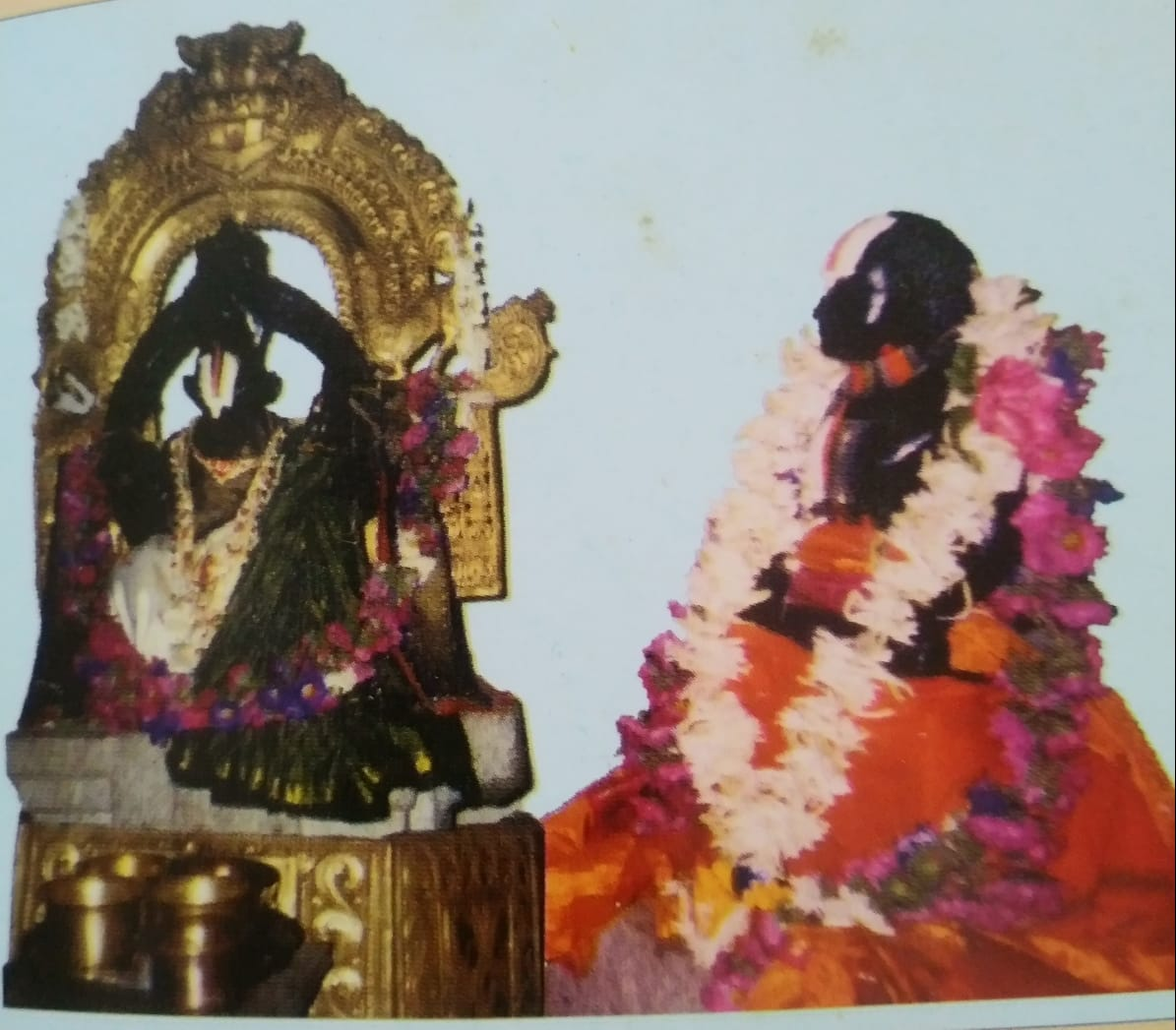
Ayee swamy at varaha sannidhi in Denkanikottai

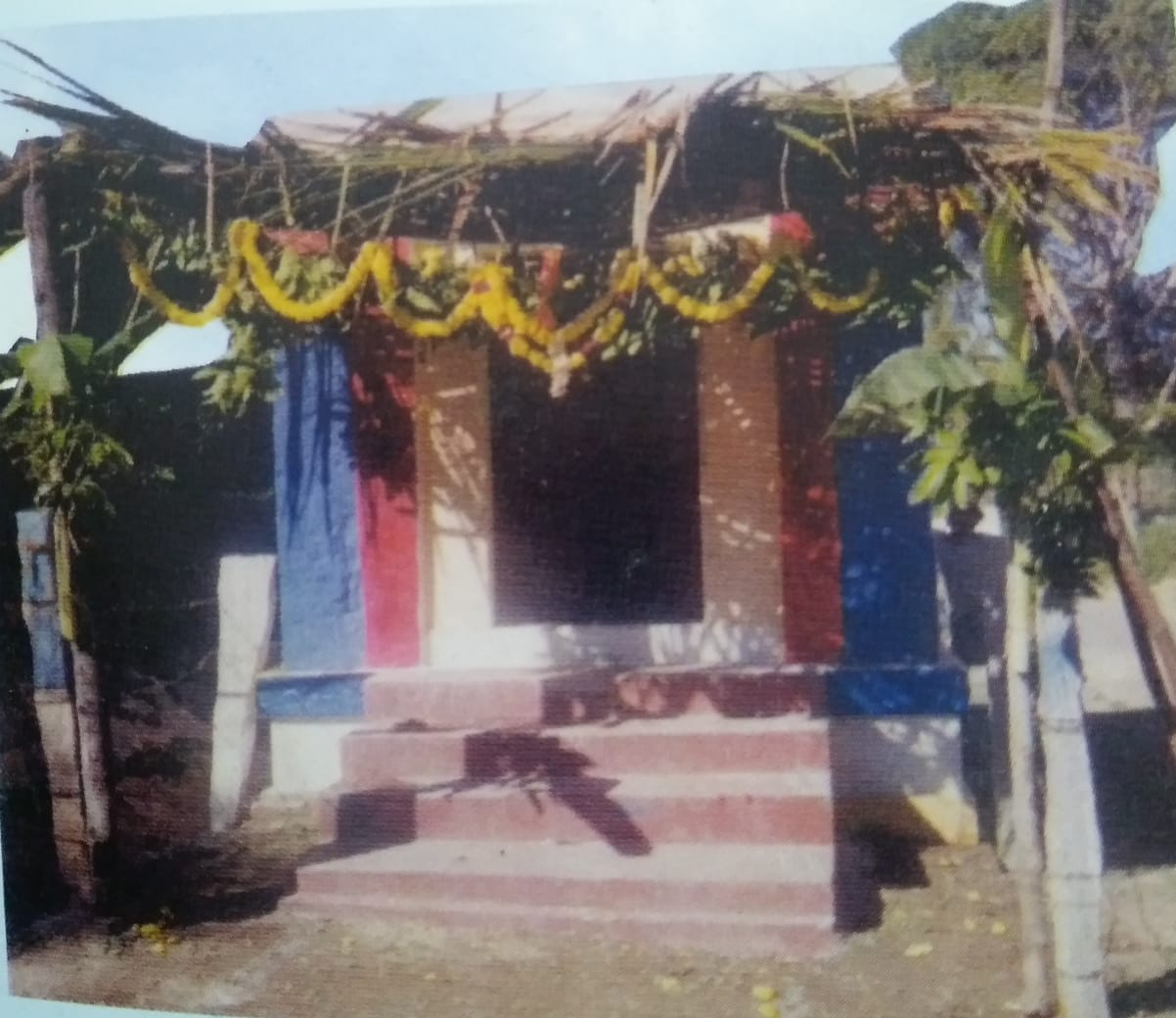
Ayee Swamy Brindavanam at Melukote

== Final Days ==
Ayee swamy spent his final days continuing his nithya kainkaryam to melukote cheluva narayana.

Ayee swamy attained the supreme abode of Paramapadam on 1445CE after serving Thirunarayanan for almost 105 years and Swami's brindavan is located near the Melukote Kalyani behind Bhuvaneshwari mantapa and can be seen on the way to Sri Yoga Narasimha Swamy temple

An idol of Ayee Jananyacharya swamy was installed in the varaha sannidhi opposite to Lord Betarayaswamy temple at Denkanikottai and a stone carving resembling Ayee swamy was installed on the foot steps of Melukote Pushkarini where swamy used to sit for his Nithya japa.
