= Balaji Temple, Nandyal =

Nandyal Balaji Temple
- Location in Andhra Pradesh

Religion
- Affiliation: Hinduism
- District: Nandyal
- Deity: Venkateshvara (Vishnu)

Location
- Location: Bilakalaguduru village
- State: Andhra Pradesh
- Country: India
- Interactive map of Nandyal Balaji Temple
- Coordinates: 15.6764025°N 78.4375141°E

Nandyal Balaji Temple is a Vishnu temple located in Bilakalaguduru village of Nandyal district in the Indian state of Andhra Pradesh. The main deity of this temple is Venkateswara, an avatar of the Hindu god Vishnu.

The temple was designed by Sameep Padora and Associates (sP+a).

== Architecture ==
The ziggurat archetype present in traditional Indian temples was adstracted in the Balaji temple at Nandyala. The temple is constructed of locally sourced black limestone. There is a reservoir adjacent to the temple within the temple premises. The reservoir supplies water to the groundwater table. Excess water from a nearby limestone quarry is pumped into the temple reservoir or cistern. Steps from the base of the temple lead down into the depths of the reservoir, allowing devotees to descend and climb in to or from the temple reservoir. The main structure of the temple—shrines of the Hindu deities Balaji and Varahaswamy—is drawn on the motifs of the Tirupathi temple of the same deity.
