= Narapura Venkateswara Temple, Jammalamadugu =

Ancient Hindu temple in Andhra Pradesh, India

Narapura Venkateswara Temple

Religion
- Affiliation: Hindu
- Deity: Venkateswara

Location
- Location: Jammalamadugu, YSR Kadapa District
- Interactive map of Narapura Venkateswara Temple
- Coordinates: 14°51′04″N 78°23′01″E

Sri Narapura Venkateswara Temple is an ancient Hindu temple situated in Jammalamadugu, YSR Kadapa District, Andhra Pradesh India. The temple is dedicated to the Hindu god Venkateswara, a form of Vishnu, who is referred to as Narapura Venkateswara. According to the temple history, the temple derives its name from Narapuraiah, a devotee of Venkateswara, who constructed this temple based on what he considered the deity's wishes. Within the main premises of the temple, there is Anjaneya temple, Kalyana Mantapam, and Goshala. The temple has been under the control of TTD since 2008. The temple is generally crowded on Saturdays being it a significant day for Venkateswara.

== Administration ==
The temple, at present is being administered by Tirumala Tirupati Devasthanams. since 23rd October 2008. Since then all the poojas are performed as per Pancharatra Agama.

== Festivals and Occasions ==
The temple gets very highly crowded on the day of Vaikunta Ekadashi. Annual Brahmotsavams or Thirunalla will be held for nine days in the month Vaisakha, which falls in the month of May. During all days of Brahmotsavam, the processions of the god's idol are done on palanquin and in the form of different Vahanas. On the day of Rathotsavam, procession will be on the temple's chariot. People within the town and around the villages of Jammalamadugu come to see the festival.

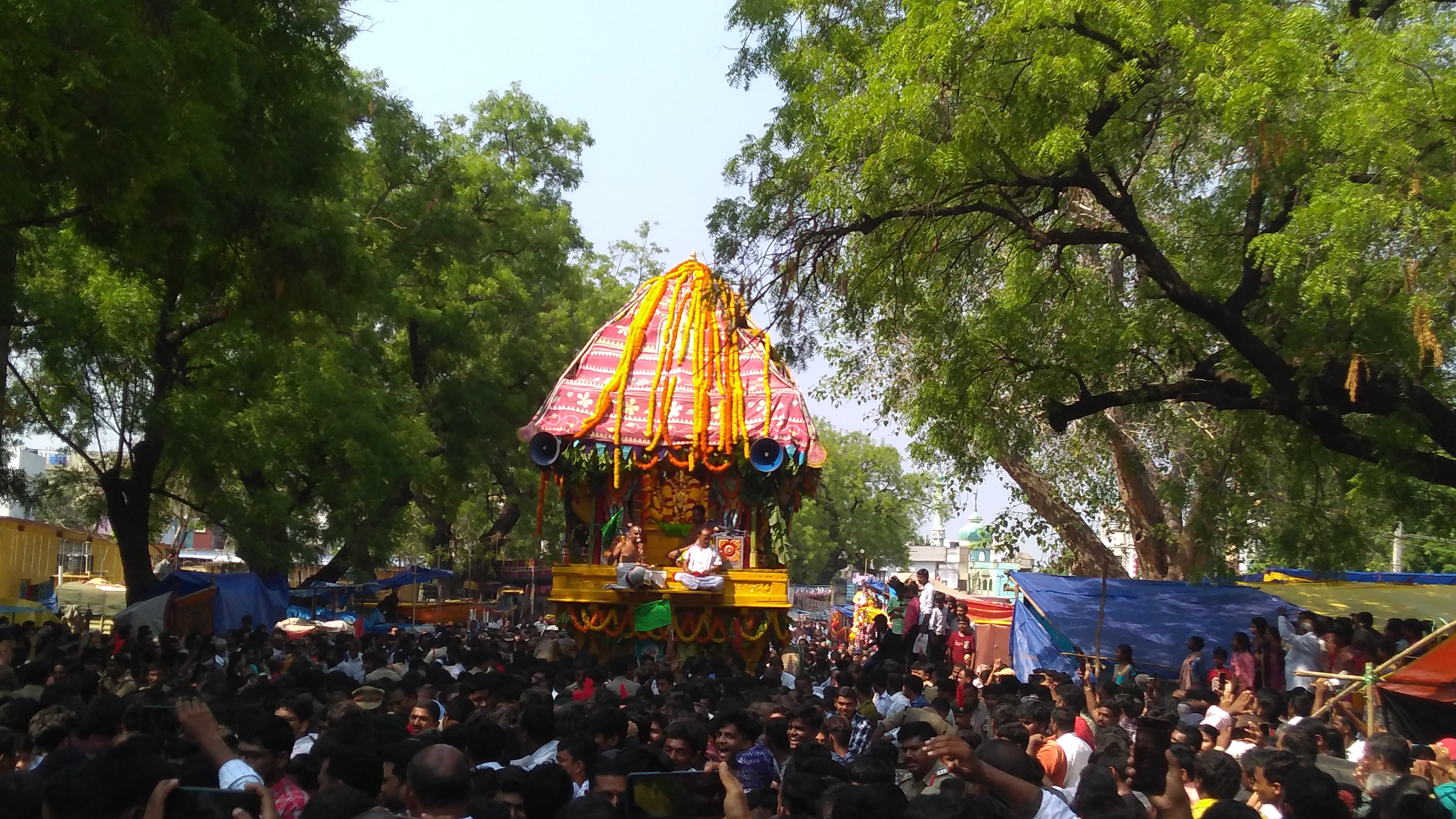
On the day of Rathotsavam in May 2023

== See also ==
- List of temples under Tirumala Tirupati Devasthanams
