= Ramanuja Nutrantati =

Work of Tamil Hindu literature

- ← Tiruvaymoli
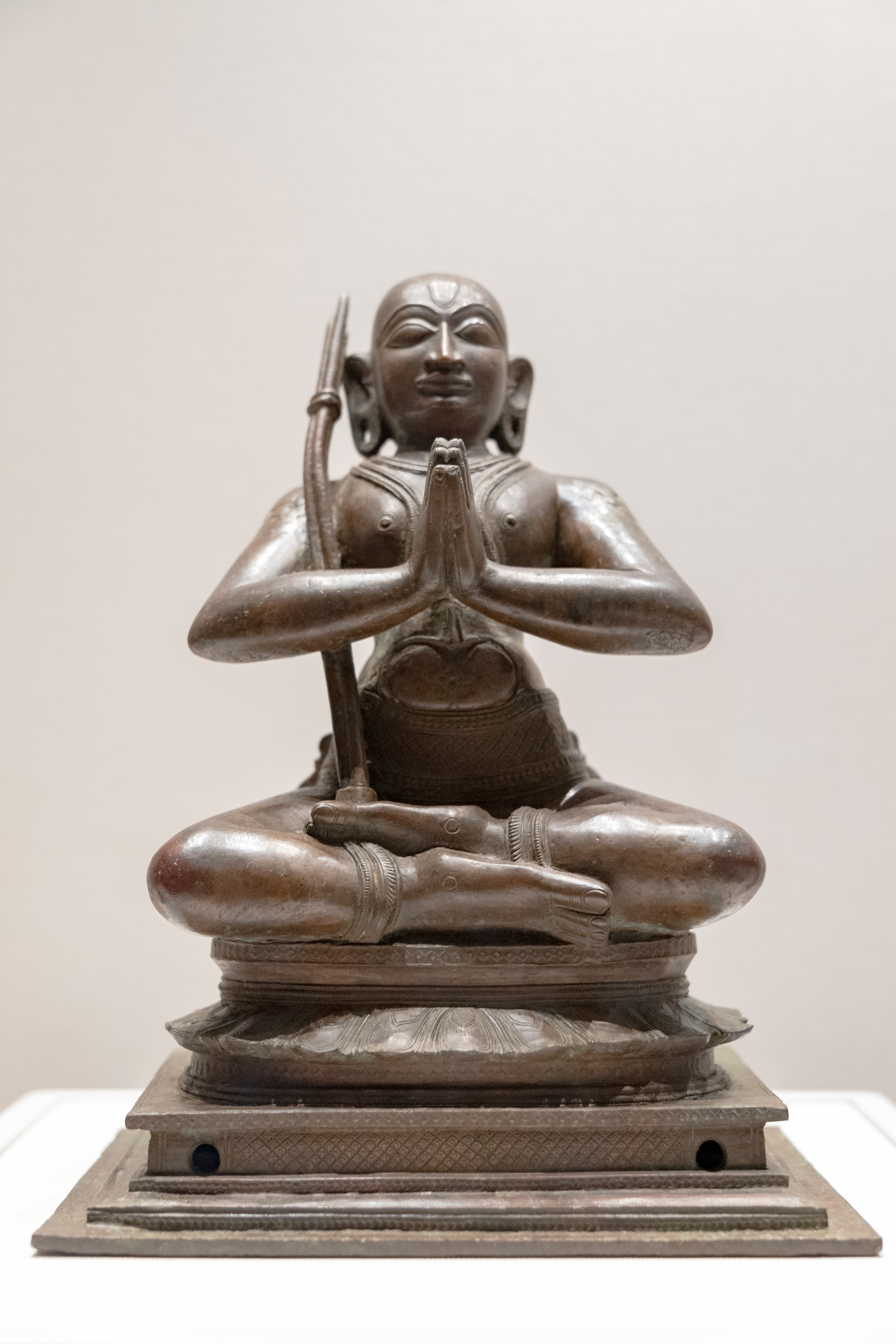
- Statue of Ramanuja.

Information
- Religion: Hinduism
- Author: Periya Koil Nambi
- Language: Tamil
- Period: 9th–10th century CE
- Verses: 108

The Ramanuja Nutrantati (Tamil: இராமானுச நூற்றந்தாதி, romanized: Rāmānuca Nūṛṛantāti, lit. 'Ramanuja's hundred hymns') is a work of Tamil Hindu literature written by Periya Koil Nambi, consisting of 108 pasurams (hymns). It was composed in the poetic style of the antati, in which the last word of each verse is also structured as the first word of the following verse.

According to Sri Vaishnava tradition, the composition of these hymns is regarded to have impressed Ramanuja so much that he conferred the epithet Tiruvarangatu Amudhanar upon the author. The saint Manavala Mamuni is regarded to have added it to the compendium of the Alvars's hymns, the Nalayira Divya Prabandham. The work is also referred to as Prapanna Gayatri in Sanskrit.

== Legend ==
According to tradition, Periya Koil Nambi was initially an opponent of Ramanuja, whose activities as the chief priest of the Srirangam temple are said to have interfered with the latter's work. The deity Ranganatha himself is said to have appeared in a dream of Nambi, pleading the case of Ramanuja. While Ramanuja started to discuss the prospect of leaving Srirangam with his disciple named Kurathalvar, Nambi appeared and sought to become a shishya (disciple) of the former, having realised his greatness. Ramanuja, however, asked Kurathalvar to accept him as his own shishya instead. With this, the animosity between the two men came to an end, and Nambi handed over the keys to the temple to Ramanuja. In time, he composed the Ramanuja Nutrantati.

== Hymns ==
The second hymn of this work extols the deeds of Ramanuja:

I cannot understand this good fortune. My heart does not think of anything other than the extreme benevolence of Ramanuja. He gave up the company of men who do not contemplate the lotus feet of the nectar-groves-surrounded-Arangam lord, and only sought the feet of the Kuraiyalur king, Tirumangai Alvar.

— Ramanuja Nutrantati, Hymn 2

== See also ==
- Periya Tiruvantati
- Periya Tirumoli
- Tiruviruttam
