= Prathivadhi Bhayankaram Annangaracharya =

Hindu saint

Prathivadhi Bhayankaram Anna

Personal life
- Born: Hasthigirinathar Aṇṇā Kanchipuram, Tamil Nadu, India
- Children: Annanappa, Ananthacharyar and Aḻagiya Manavala Perumal
- Notable works: Sri Venkatesa Suprabhatam, Stotram, Prapatti, Mangala Sasanam.; Short vyakhyas (commentaries) for Sri Bhashya, Sri Bhagavatam, Subalopanishad.; Vyakhya for Bhattar’s Ashta Sloki.; Kumara Nayanacharya Sathakam, Kumara nayanacharya Mangalam, Kumara Nayanacharya suprabhatam.

Religious life
- Religion: Hinduism
- Philosophy: Vishishtadvaita
- Sect: Sri Vaishnavism

Religious career
- Teacher: Manavala Mamunigal
- Disciples: Annanappa, Anantacharyar, Aḻagiya Manavala Perumal Nayanar

Prathivadhi Bhayankaram Aṇṇā was a Sri Vaishnava acharya, Tamil and Sanskrit scholar, and the composer of the popular Venkateswara Suprabhatam. Born Hasthigirinathar Aṇṇā in the year 1361, he was one of the prominent disciples of Manavala Mamunigal, belonged to a distinguished line of "Acharya Puruṣas", amassing followers. Aṇṇā composed many hymns, of which the popular Venkateshwara Suprabhatham, Venkateṣa Stotram, Venkateṣa Prapatti and Venkateṣa Mangaļāṣāsanam are recited daily at the Tirumala Venkateswara Temple in the wee hours of the day to ritually rouse Venkateshvara. The rendition of the hymns by the singer M S Subbulakshmi is played every day in millions of households in India and abroad.

== Life ==
Aṇṇā was born in Kanchipuram, and initiated into the Sri Vaishnava Sampradāyam by his father, who was the 10th generation descendant of Mudumbai Nambi, one of the 74 simhāsanādipathis appointed by Ramanuja. He later approached Vedanta Desika's son, Nayana-Varadāchārya, to learn Sri Bhashya. Nayana-Varadāchārya gave him the name "Prathivathi Bhayankaram Aṇṇan". Finding inconsistencies in the philosophy of Nayana-Varadāchārya, as propounded by his Father-Guru Vedānta Deśika, Aṇṇan gave up his association, went to the Tirumala Venkateswara Temple, and rendered devotional service to Venkateswara.

At the Tirumala Venkateswara Temple, Aṇṇan heard the glories of Manavala Mamuni and about his discourses on the works of the Alvars, and his crystal-clear explanation of the doctrines of the Sri Vaishnava Sampradayam. Following this, Aṇṇan became the disciple of Manavala Mamunigal, and learnt the entire commentaries of these works from him at Srirangam. Manavala Mamunigal gave him the dāsya nama "Sri Vaiṣnava Dāsan", seeing his humility towards the devotees of their deity. Further, Manavala Mamunigal, after seeing Annan's prowess in Sribhāṣyam, bestowed him the Sribhāṣya Simhāsanam, and the title 'Sribhāṣyāchārya'. Aṇṇan also served as one of the ashtadiggajas of Manavala Mamunigal. Aṇṇā was acknowledged as an authority on Sanskrit literature and spiritual discourses in his time. He is said to be the most prominent scholar in South India of his time, and was widely respected throughout India.

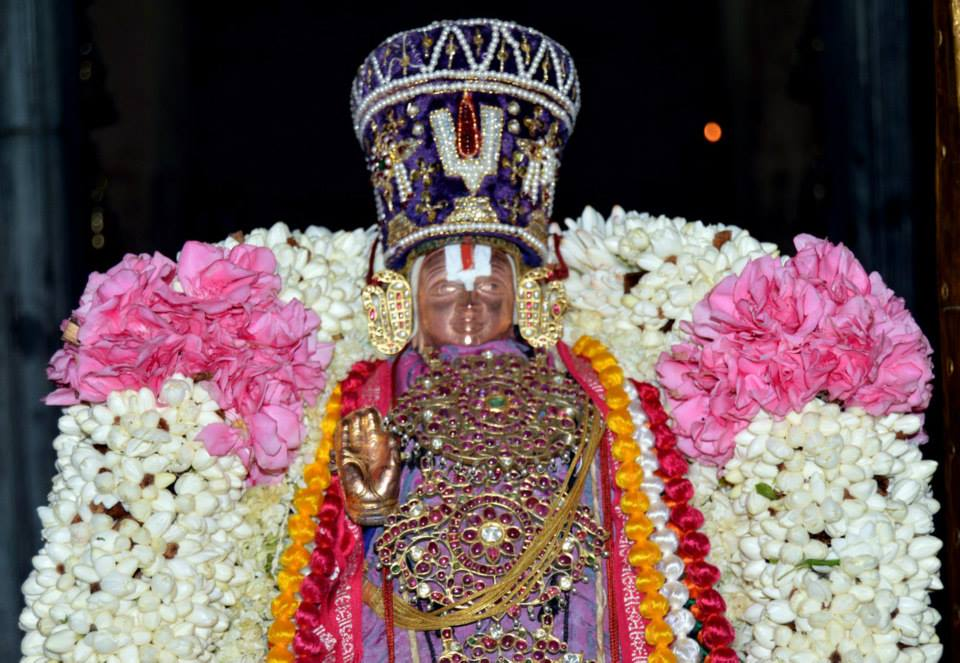
Murti of the saint

== Literary works ==
- Sri Venkateṣa Suprabhātam,
- Sri Venkateṣa Stotram,
- Sri Venkateṣa Prapatti,
- Sri Venkateṣa Mangaļa Sāsanam, authored as ordered by Māmunigaļ.
- Short Commentary (Vyākhya) for Sri Bhaṣyam,
- Short Commentary (Vyākhya) for Srimad Bhāgavatam,
- Short Commentary (Vyākhya) for Subala Upaniṣada.
- Commentary (Vyākhya) for Bhattar's Aṣta Shloki.
- Varavara Muni Sathakam (100 ṣlokas in Sanskrit in glorification of Māmunigaļ),
- Varavara Muni Mangalam,
- Varavara Muni Suprabhātam, "Cheyya Thāmarai Thālinai Vāḻiye…"
- Vāḻi Thirunamam Of Māmunigal (recited at the end of Arulicheyal Goṣti),
- Other Sloka Granthams
- Other Stotra Granthams
