= Suprabhatam =

Sanskrit prayer

Suprabhatam (Sanskrit: सुप्रभातम्, romanized: Suprabhātam, lit. 'auspicious dawn') is a Sanskrit prayer of the Suprabhātakāvya genre. It is a collection of hymns or verses recited early morning to awaken the deity in Hinduism. The metre chosen for a Suprabhātam poem is usually Vasantatilaka.

The most well-known Suprabhātam work is the Veṅkaṭeśvarasuprabhātam recited to awaken the deity Venkateswara. A rendition of the poem by renowned Carnatic vocalist M. S. Subbulakshmi is extremely popular which is played daily in many homes and temples (especially Tirumala Tirupati) in the wee hours of morning.

== History ==
The genre of Suprabhātakāvya traces its origin to a single verse (1.23.2) in the Bālakāṇḍa of Vālmīki's Rāmāyaṇa, where Viśvāmitra calls out to Rāma to wake up.

O Rāma, the noble son of Kausalyā! The Sandhyā of the East commences. O! best of men (Purushottama)! Wake up, the daily duties have to be performed.

The Veṅkaṭeśvarasuprabhātam begins with this very verse.

== Suprabhatam Works ==
The Veṅkaṭeśa Suprabhātam is by far the most popular and iconic work composed in the Suprabhātam format.

There are many other lesser-known Suprabhātam works apart from the Veṅkaṭeśasuprabhātam. Some of these are -

- Śrī Vighneśvara Suprabhātam. A Suprabhātam composition eulogizing Gaṇeśa.
- Śrī Siddhivināyaka Suprabhātam. A work praising Siddhivināyaka. Composed by M. Ramakrishna Bhat, retired professor of Benares Hindu University.
- Śrī Kāśīviśvanātha Suprabhātam. A Suprabhātam dedicated to Kāśī Viśvanātha.
- Śrīsītārāma Suprabhātam. A Suprabhāta poem eulogizing Sītā and Rāma. Composed by Jagadguru Rambhadracharya.
- Kāmākshi Suprabhātam; A unique composition by Sri Lakshmī Kāntha Sharma, dedicated to Goddess Kāmākshi at Kanchipuram
- Vedavyasa Suprabhatam written by Sudhindra Thirtha (Kashi Math) of Kashi Math samsthan.
- Sri Guruvayoorappa Suprabhatam by P Leela
- Śrī Veṅkaṭeśa Suprabhatham in Malayalam by S Balakrishnan Karippara Dharmooth
- Śrī Lakshmī Suprabhātam by Anuradha Paudwal
- Śrī Durgā Suprabhātam by N.S. Praskah and Gopika Poornima

== Śrī Venkaṭeśa Suprabhātam ==
The Veṅkaṭeśvarasuprabhātam was composed sometime between 1420 and 1432 CE by Prativādibhayaṅkaram Śrī Annan (also known as Hastigirinathar Anna, and P B Annan). The poet was a disciple of Swami Manavala Mamuni, who was himself a disciple of Ramanuja.

The Venkaṭeśvara Suprabhātam consists of four sections: Suprabhātam, Śrī Venkaṭeśvara Stotram, Prapatti, and Mangalāśāsanam.

== Printed sources ==
- Rambhadracharya, Svami (January 14, 2009), Śrīsītārāmasuprabhātam (in Sanskrit), Chitrakuta, Uttar Pradesh, India: Jagadguru Rambhadracharya Vikalang Vishvavidyalaya
