= Dwaraka Tirumala =

- Census town
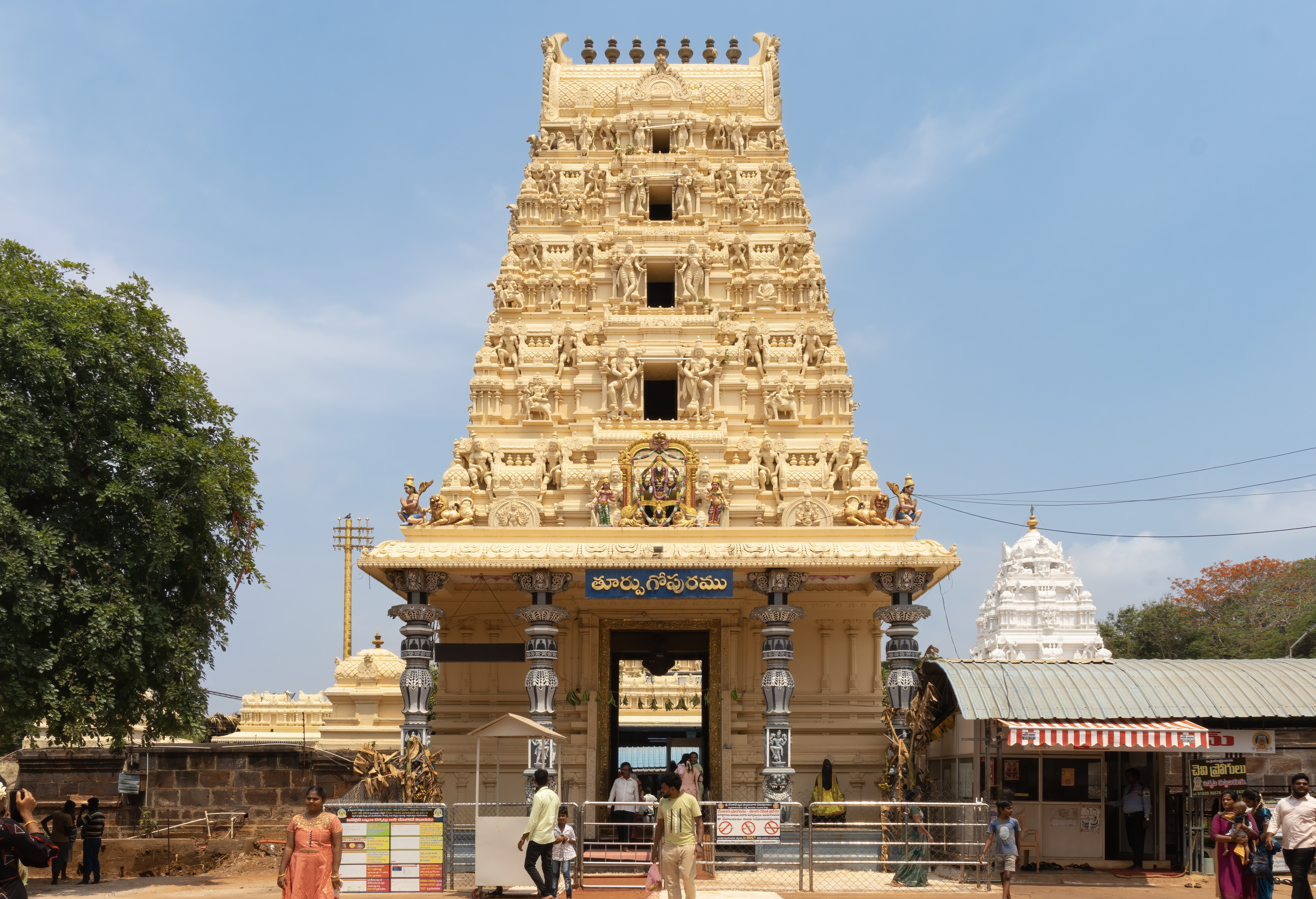
- Gopuram of Dwaraka Thirumala temple
- Nickname: chinna tirupati
- Location in Andhra Pradesh, India
- Coordinates: 16.57°N 81.15°E
- Country: India
- State: Andhra Pradesh
- District: Eluru
- Talukas: Dwaraka Tirumala

Area
  - Total: 2.18 km^{2} (0.84 sq mi)
  - Rank: 1

Population (2018)
  - Total: 6,558
  - Rank: 2
  - Density: 3,010/km^{2} (7,790/sq mi)

Languages
  - Official: Telugu
- Time zone: UTC+5:30 (IST)
- PIN: 534426
- Telephone code: +91–8829
- Vehicle registration: AP

Dwaraka Tirumala is a census town in Eluru district of the Indian state of Andhra Pradesh. It is located in Dwaraka Tirumala mandal of Jangareddygudem revenue division. The Venkateswara Temple is a pilgrimage center for Hindus, which is the abode of Lord Venkateswara. This is often referred by the locals as Chinna Tirupati, meaning mini Tirupati.

== Transport ==
APSRTC operates buses from Eluru, Rajamahendravaram, Tadepalligudem, Vijayawada, Chintalapudi, Jangareddygudem, Bhimadole, Hyderabad and Bhadrachalam to Dwarakatirumala bus station.. Nearest railway station is Bhimadolu and express trains stop is Eluru.
