= Gandi Kshetram =

Hindu temple in Kadapa District, Andhra Pradesh, India

Sri Veeranjaneya Temple or Gandi Kshetram is a Hindu temple situated at Gandi, a village in Kadapa District of Andhra Pradesh in India. The temple is dedicated to the god Anjaneya (Hanuman) who is referred to as Veeranjaneya in this temple.

== History ==
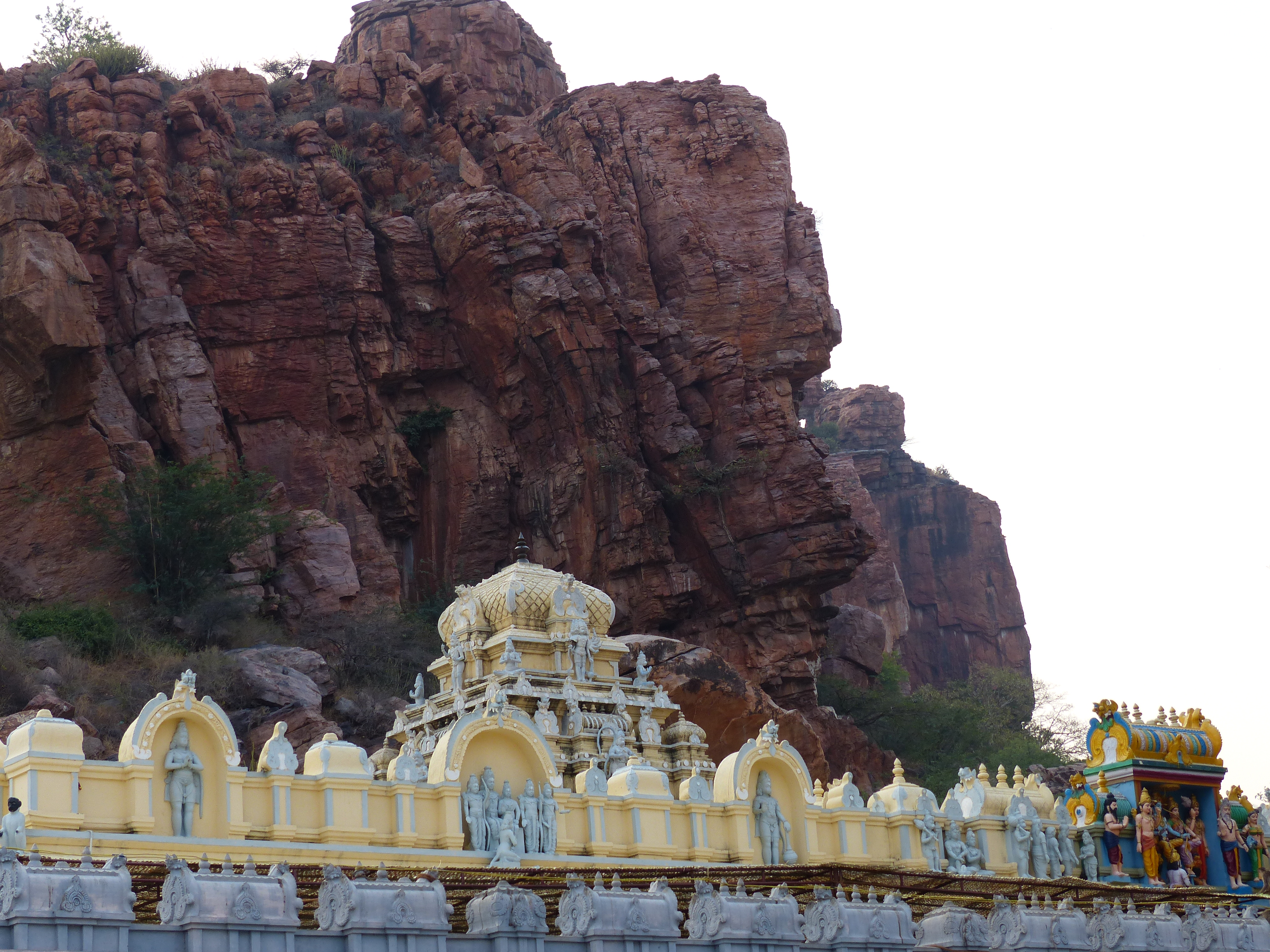
Temple of Abhayahastha Anjaneya Swamy on the banks of River papagni

The history of Kshetram dates back to the period of the Ramayana, Treta Yuga. According to the legend, the god Rama himself had drawn the picture of Hanuman on the rock with his arrow while resting at this place, and was receiving the hospitality of Vayu, the god of the wind and father of Hanuman. Rama completed the drawing of Hanuman except the little finger of Hanuman's left hand.

Later Vyasaraja sculpted an idol of Hanuman on the drawing and tried to sculpt the unfinished finger. However, it is said that finger broke and started bleeding, indicating Hanuman's wish for the drawing to be true to the drawing.

As per legend after Rama's victory over the demon king Ravana, Vayu decorated this place with festoon of golden flowers to welcome Rama on his way back towards North to Ayodhya. People believe that this festoon of golden flowers can be seen by those who are near to death.

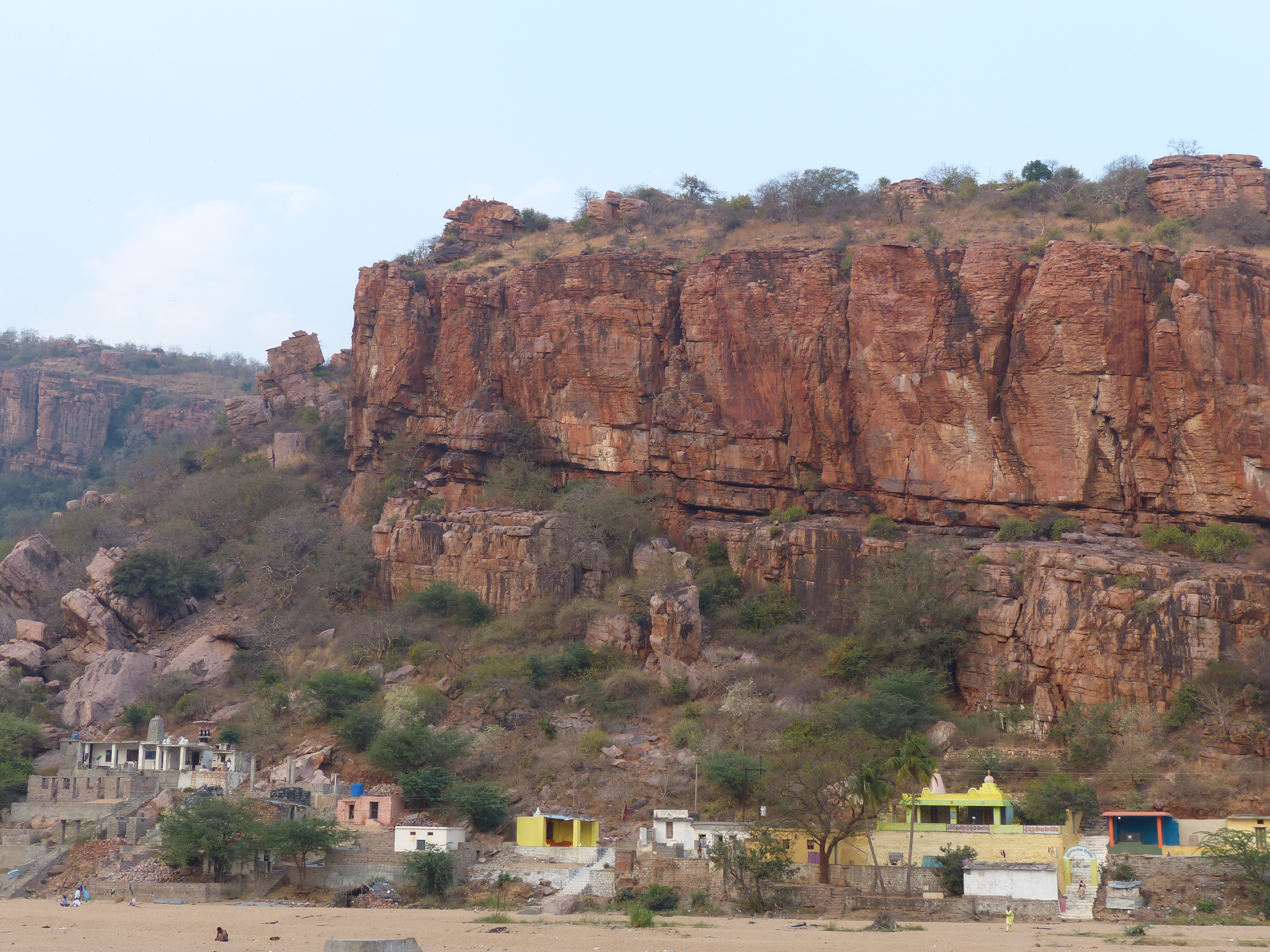
Bank of the river Papagni at Gandi Kshetram opposite to the temple of Hanuman

== Location ==
This temple is known as Abhayahasta Anjaneya Temple and is located on the banks of River Papaghni. In Telugu language Gandi means a narrow passage for the water to flow out. This place seems to be a narrow passage for the river to flow in between the hills of Eastern ghats. This place located in Kadapa district and is 34 km away from the Pulivendula town.

== Administration ==
The temple, at present is being administered by ENDOMENTS DEPT AP
