= Koyyalagudem, Eluru district =

Koyyalagudem
- Interactive map of Koyyalagudem
- Location in Andhra Pradesh, India Koyyalagudem (India)
- Coordinates: 17°07′43″N 81°25′38″E
- Country: India
- State: Andhra Pradesh
- District: Eluru
- Elevation: 74 m (243 ft)

Languages
  - Official: Telugu
- Time zone: UTC+5:30 (IST)
- PIN: 534312
- Telephone code: 08821
- Vehicle registration: AP 37

Koyyalagudem is a mandal in Eluru district of the Indian state of Andhra Pradesh. Koyyalagudem comes under Jangareddygudem revenue division.

Koyyalagudem comes under Polavaram (ST) (Assembly constituency) and Eluru (Lok Sabha constituency). Koyyalagudem is 49 km away from Rajahmundry, 67 km away from Eluru, the district headquarters and 36 km away from Polavaram.

Villages under koyyalagudem mandal are koyyalagudem, Ponguturu, Bayyanagudem, gavaravaram, kanapuram, Rajavaram, yerampeta.

Koyyalagudem mandal is one of the 46 mandals in the West Godavari district of the Indian state of Andhra Pradesh.[2] It is administered under the Kovvur revenue division.[2]

== Villages ==
1. Villages Administrative Division Population

1) ANKALAGUDEM POPULATION = 4012

2) Chopparamannagudem Koyyalagudem Population = 1,437

3) Dippakayalapadu Koyyalagudem Population = 5,408

4) Eduvadalapalem Koyyalagudem Population = 1,228

5) Gavaravaram Koyyalagudem Population = 4,141

6) Kanakadripuram Koyyalagudem Population = 361

7) Kannapuram Koyyalagudem Population = 5,977

8) Kannayagudem Koyyalagudem Population = 778

9) Kuntalagudem Koyyalagudem Population = 905

10) Mahadevapuram Koyyalagudem Population = 99

11) Mangapathidevipeta Population = Koyyalagudem 2,244

12) koyyalagudem Koyyalagudem Population = 22,300

13) Ponguturu Koyyalagudem Population = 9,298

14) Rajavaram Koyyalagudem Population = 6,443

15) Ramanujapuram Koyyalagudem Population = 2079 16) Saripalle Koyyalagudem Population = 3,521

17) Vedanthapuram Koyyalagudem Population = 2,149

18) Yerrampeta Koyyalagudem Population = 3,496

== Geography ==
Koyyalagudem is located at 17.1167°N 81.3000°E. It has an average elevation of 74 metres (246 ft).
