= Venkateswara =

Major deity in Hinduism

- God of the Seven Hills; God of Tirupati
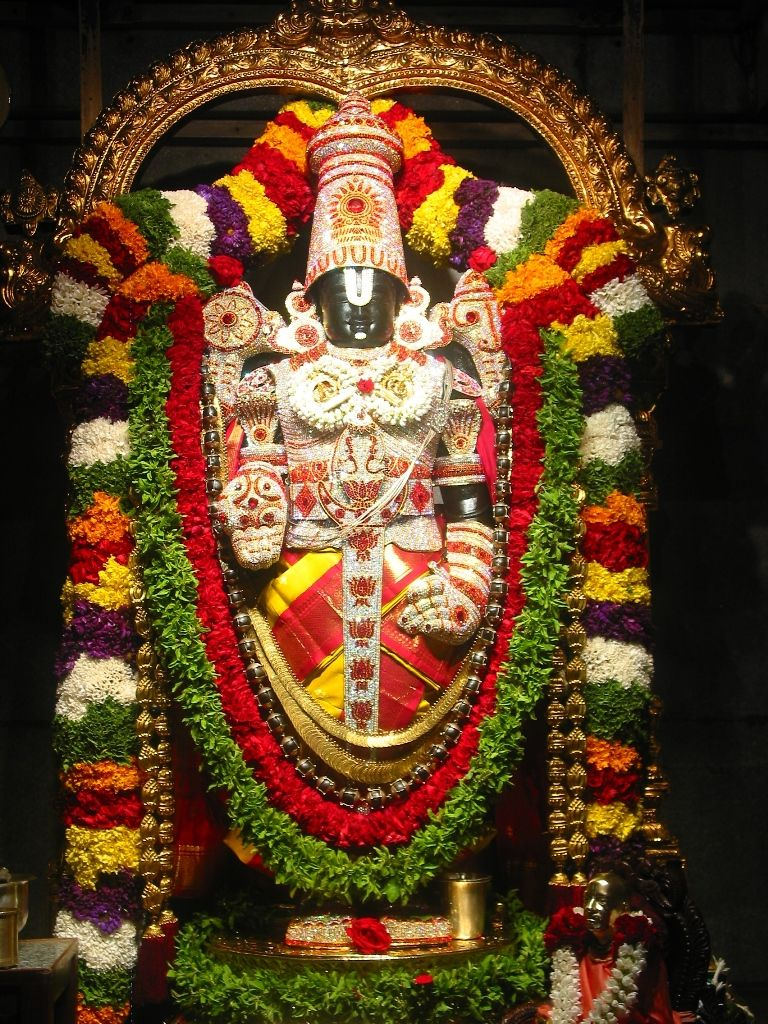
- Venkateswara at the ISKCON Bangalore
- Other names: Srinivasa, Govinda, Venkata Ramana, Venkatachalapati, Yedukondalavadu, Balaji, Tirupati Timmappa, Perumal
- Venerated in: Vaishnavism
- Affiliation: Form of Vishnu
- Abode: Tirumala; Vaikuntha
- Mantra: Om Namo Narayanaya; Om Namo Venkateshaya
- Weapon: Sudarshana Chakra; Nandaka
- Symbols: Sricharanam
- Mount: Garuda
- Texts: Bhavishya purana; Brahmanda purana; Padma Purana; Skanda Purana; Varaha Purana; Sri Venkatachala Mahatmyam
- Temple: Venkateswara Temple, Tirumala
- Consort: Padmavati (Sridevi) and Bhudevi

Venkateswara, also known as Venkatachalapati, Srinivasa and Govinda is a deity, described as a form of the god Vishnu. He is the presiding deity of Venkateswara Temple, Tirupati. His consorts, Padmavati and Bhudevi, are avatars of the goddess Lakshmi.

== Etymology and other names ==
Venkateswara literally means "Lord of Venkata". The word is a combination of the words Venkata (the name of a hill in Andhra Pradesh) and iśvara ("Lord"). The Venkatam hill is mentioned in Tamil Sangam literature dated to 300 BCE. According to the Brahmanda and Bhavishyottara Puranas which are dated to 500 CE to 1000 CE, the word "Venkata" means "destroyer of sins", deriving from the Tamil words vem (sins) and kata (power of immunity).

Venkateswara is known by many names such as Srinivasa (in whom Lakshmi dwells), Narayana (The Primordial One), Perumal (the great lord), Malayappa (the lord of the Hill) and Govinda (Protector of Cows). In Tamil, he is commonly called "Elumalayan" (ஏழுமலையான்), meaning Lord of Seven Hills. In Telugu, he is commonly known as "ఏడు కొండలవాడా,” (Ēḍu Koṇḍala Vāḍā), also meaning the Lord of the Seven Hills. In Telugu, the hill name was 'Venkatam, Vēṅkaṭam', which is another form of 'Vaikuntam', and it follows that Venkateswara means Vaikunteswara or God of Vaikuntha. Vaikuntha refers to the residence of Vishnu.

The Venkateswara mantra is "Om Namo Venkateshaya".

== Legends ==
=== Appearance ===
Every year, hundreds of thousands of devotees donate substantial offerings to the Venkateswara Temple at Tirupati, Andhra Pradesh. A legend explains this tradition of providing donations.

According to the legend, Narada once observed a few rishis performing a holy yagna. Unable to decide who the yagna should benefit, he recruited sage Bhrigu to decide by meeting with each of the Trimurti in their abodes. Bhrigu visited Brahma in Brahmaloka and Shiva in Kailasha and went unnoticed by both of these deities. He finally reached Vaikuntha and met Vishnu, who was absorbed in meditation, attended to by his consort, the goddess Lakshmi. Angered by being disregarded a third time, a furious Bhrigu kicked Vishnu's chest (the abode of Lakshmi) and provoked the wrath of Lakshmi. But a calm Vishnu asked for forgiveness of Bhrigu, and served the sage by massaging his legs. During this act, he crushed the extra eye that was present on the sole of Bhrigu's foot, which destroyed the sage's egotism. Lakshmi then departed from Vaikuntha, and reached Kolhapur. Vishnu performed an intense penance for twelve years, after which she was born as Padmavathi to Akasha Raja.

After Lakshmi left, Vishnu went to Venkata Hill, sat in an anthill under a tamarind tree beside a pushkarini (lake), and started chanting the name of his wife, Mahalakshmi. He then reincarnated as Srinivasa (or presented himself after penance in the ant-hill) as the son of the elderly woman Vakula Devi, who was the rebirth of Yashoda the deity Krishna's foster-mother. Unhappy that she had been unable to attend Krishna's wedding to Rukmini, the deity promised that he would be reborn to her as a son, as Srinivasa.

=== Marriage to Padmavathi ===
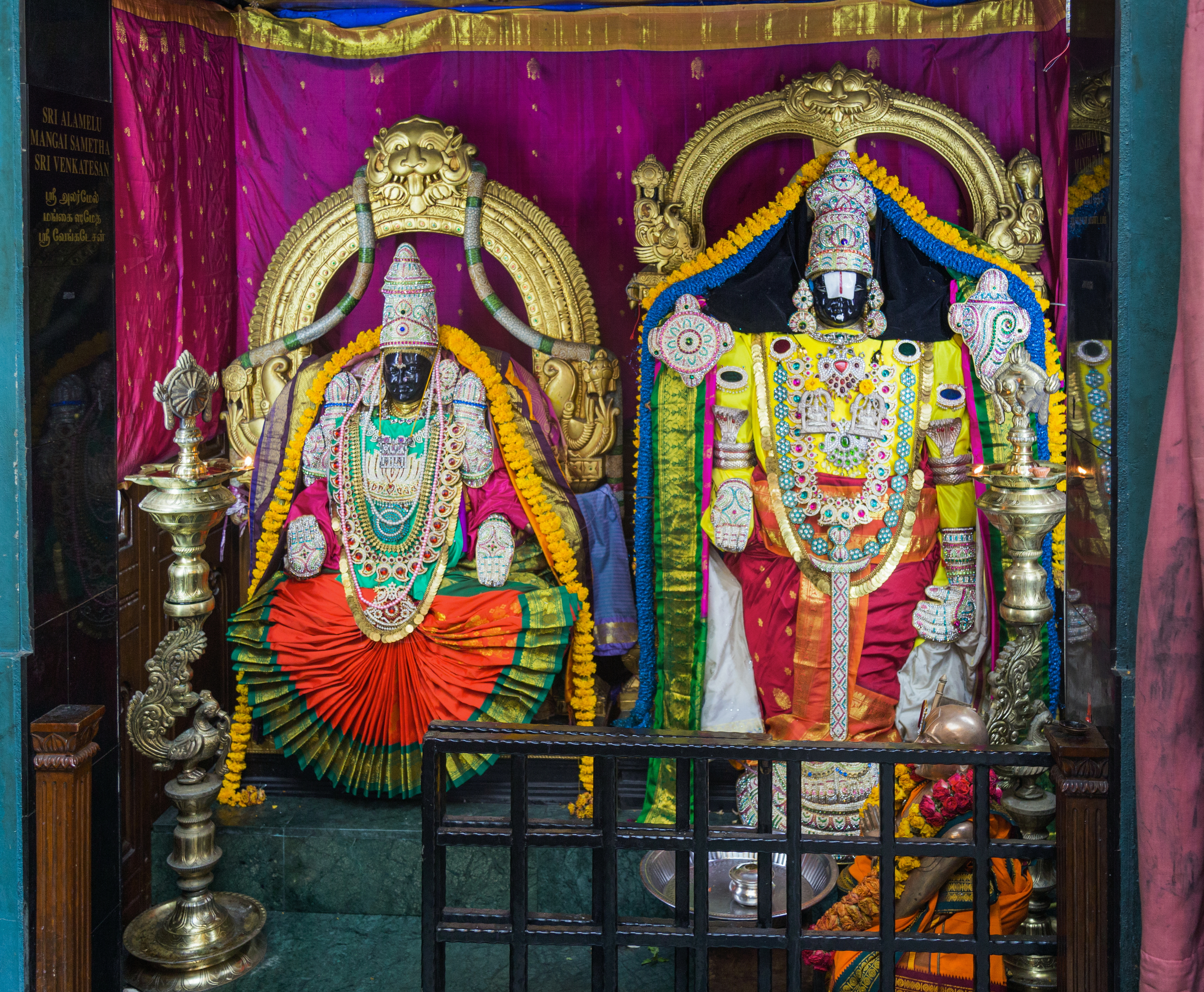
Venkateswara and Padmavathi at a temple in Singapore

Once Srinivasa was hunting in the forest and chasing a wild elephant. The elephant led him into a royal garden where Princess Padmavati (an incarnation of Lakshmi) daughter of Aakasha Raja and her maids were picking flowers. Startled by the elephant, the women were terrified, but the animal immediately saluted the Lord and disappeared, sparking his love for the Princess, Srinivasa Enchanted her beauty and fell in love and describe all events to vakula Devi.

Vakula Devi travelled from her hermitage to approach Akasha Raja with her proposal of marriage between Srinivasa and Padmavathi. In the meantime, the restless deity came to the city in the disguise of a fortune-teller. Princess Padmavathi also fell in love with Srinivasa and fell ill after returning to the palace. Unable to diagnose the cause of her sickness, the maids invited the fortune-teller into the palace to foretell the future of the princess. When the fortune-teller revealed that Padmavathi was born to marry Vishnu in his current avatar as Srinivasa, she recovered. As the king heard this news, Vakula announced herself to the king and asked for his daughter's hand in marriage to her son, Srinivasa. The overjoyed king agreed and his advisor Brihaspati wrote the invitation for the wedding between the two deities.

Srinivasa asked the gods for consent to his marriage with Padmavathi. The deity also obtained a large loan from Kubera, the god of wealth, towards the expenses for the wedding as well as provide proof of his wealth. According to legends, Venkateswara married Padmavathi at Kalyana Venkateswara Temple, Narayanavanam, after which they moved to Tirumala.

=== Srinivasa turns into Venkateswara ===
About six months after the celestial wedding, Brahma and Shiva explained to Lakshmi her consort Vishnu's desire to be on the seven hills for the emancipation of mankind from the perpetual troubles of Kali Yuga. Lakshmi as well as her form as Padmavathi also turn into stone idols as an expression of their wish to always be with their deity. Lakshmi stays with him on the left side of his chest while Padmavathi rests on the right side of his chest.

== Iconography and symbolism ==
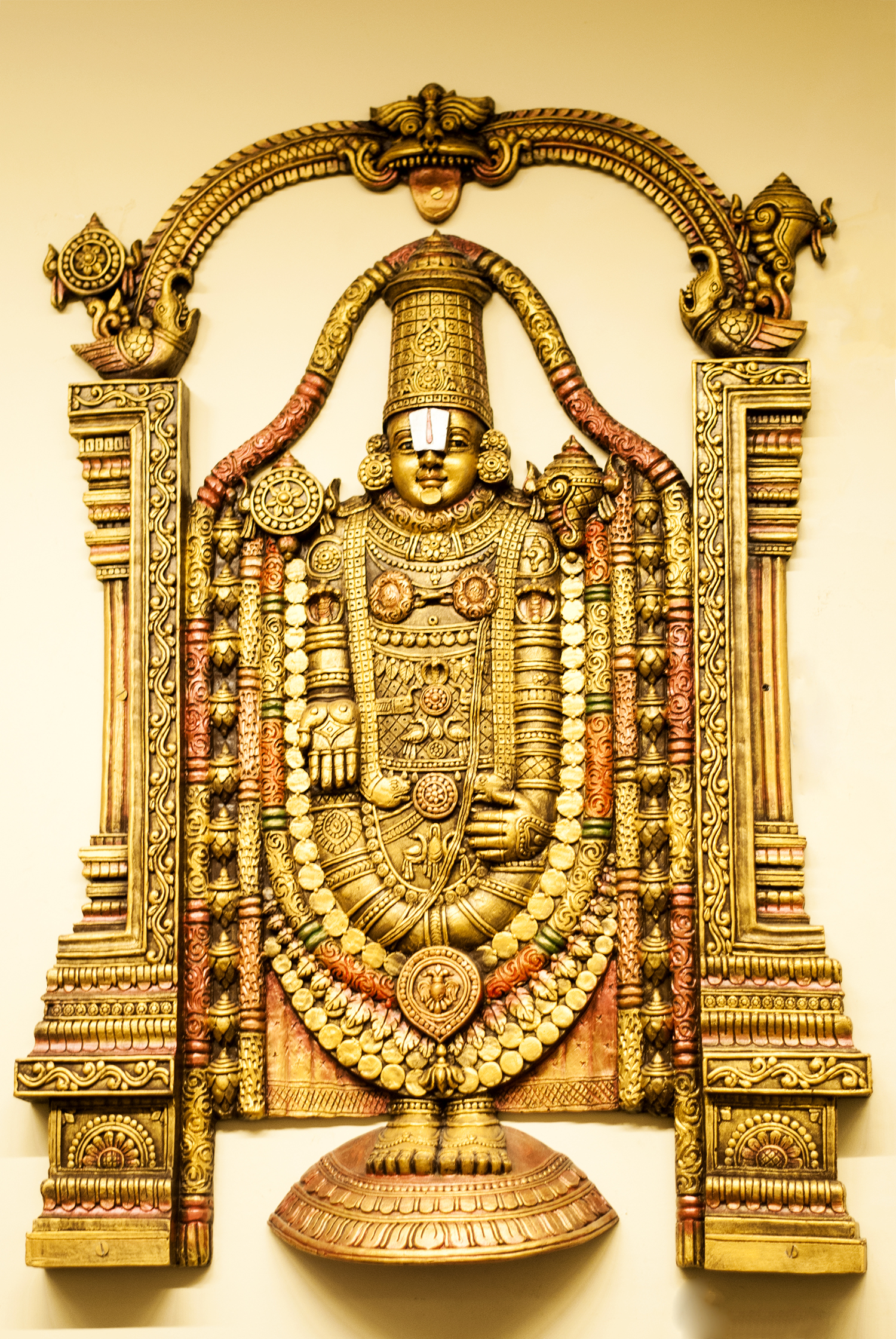
Idol of Venkateswara

The idol of Venkateswara has the attributes of both Vishnu and Shiva- the preserving and destroying aspects of the Hindu Trinity. The deity wears ornaments associated with Vishnu, but also ornaments such as the Naga, associated with Shiva. As such, followers believe that Venkateswara represents the vishwarup, or universal form, encompassing all of God's forms as described in Chapter 11 of the Bhagavad Gita.

Venkateswara is known to stand for goodness. His disc is believed to annihilate evil, while the conch is presumed to produce the cosmic sound that puts an end to the world's ignorance. Venkateswara is also known as Sat-Chit-Ananda.

== Literature ==
Venkateswara finds his mention in the Puranas, mainly in Padma Purana and Skanda Purana (as a form of Vishnu). Other Puranas also mentioned him as an avatar of Vishnu. Additionally, Sri Venkatachala Mahatmyam a text glorifies the deity and has hymns related to his worship.

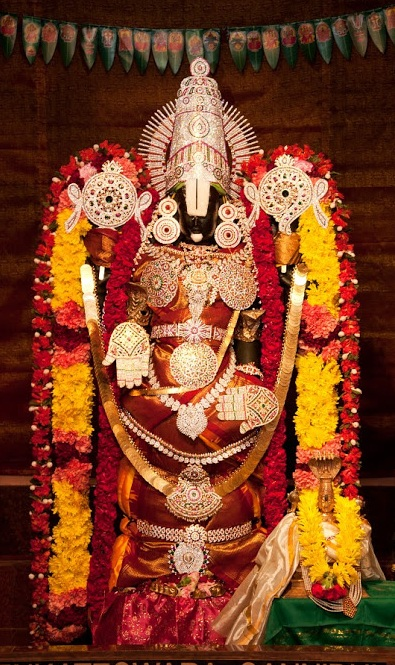
Venkateswara being worshipped as Balaji

Skanda Purana extols the significance of worshipping this deity:

If people wish for perpetual happiness and kingdom in heaven, let them joyously bow down at least once to the Lord residing on Veṅkaṭādri.

Whatever may be the sins committed in the course of crores of births, all of them perish by visiting Venkateswara.

If anyone remembers Veṅkaṭeśa, the great Lord, on account of his association with other people, or out of curiosity, or due to covetousness or on account of fear, he shall not be miserable here or hereafter.

One who glorifies and worships the Lord of Devas on Veṅkaṭācala shall certainly attain Sārūpya with Viṣṇu. There is no doubt about it.

Just as a well-kindled fire reduces firewood to ash in a moment, so also a visit to Veṅkaṭeśa destroys all sins.

— Skanda Purana, Chapter 18.

== Worship and festivals ==
Venkateshwara, an aspect of Vishnu, is the presiding deity of the Tirupati temple. It is believed that the deity is Swayambhu (self manifested). Ten Puranas state that Tirupati is a form of Vishnu. Even deity appears similar to 108 Divya Desams - Vaishnava temple Vishnu deities. The deity is believed to be as old as the "Shila thoranam" in Tirumala. Tirumala has tremendous fame from the ancient period. The deity is referred to as 'Balaji' by North Indians. The scriptures state that Venkateshwara is the saviour of all suffering people in the Kali Yuga.

In the 12th century, Ramanuja visited Tirupati to settle a dispute that had arisen between the Shaivites and Vaishnavites regarding the nature of the deity set up in the Tirumala temple. Ramanuja streamlined the rituals at Tirumala temple according to Vaikanasa Agama tradition, and introduced the recitation of the Naalayira Divya Prabandham. He also set up the Tirupati Jeeyar Matha in 1119 CE, in consultation with Tirumalai Ananthalwan to institutionalise service to the deity and supervise the temple rituals. The Jeeyars, to this day, ensures that the rituals ordained by Ramanuja are observed.

=== The five deities ===
According to the Vaikhanasa Agamas, Venkateswara is represented by five deities (berams) including the Moolavirat, which are together referred to as the Pancha beramulu in Telugu (pancha means five; beram means deity). The five deities are Dhruva Beram (Moolavar), Kautuka Beram, Snapana Beram, Utsava Beram, and Bali Beram. All the pancha berams are placed in the Garbha griha under Ananda Nilayam.

1. Moolavirat (Chief deity) or Dhruva Beram: In the centre of the Garbha griha, under the Ananda Nilayam Vimana, the Moolavirat of Venkateswara is seen in a standing posture on a lotus base, with four arms, two holding shanka and chakra, one in the Varada posture, and the other in the Kati posture. This deity is considered the main source of energy for the temple, and is adorned with the Vaishnavite nama and jewels, including vajra kiritam (diamond crown), Makarakundalas, Nagabharana, Makara Kanti, Saligrama haram, Lakshmi haram. Venkateswara's consort, Lakshmi, stays on the chest of the Moolavirat as Vyuha Lakshmi.
2. Bhoga Srinivasa or Kautuka Beram: This is a small one-foot (0.3 m) silver deity that was given to the temple in 614 AD by the Pallava queen, Samavai, for conducting festivals. Bhoga Srinivasa is always placed near the left foot of Moolavirat, and is believed to always be connected to the main deity by the holy Sambandha Kroocha. This deity receives many daily sevas (pleasures) on behalf of Moolavar, and is hence known as Bhoga Srinivasa (Bhoga: pleasure). This deity receives Ekanthaseva daily (the last ritual of the day), and Sahasra Kalasabhisheka (a special abhishekam (ablution) with sacred waters in 1008 kalashas (pots)) on Wednesdays.
3. Ugra Srinivasa or Snapana Beram: This deity represents the fearsome (Ugra: terrible) aspect of Venkateswara. This deity was the main processional deity until 1330 CE, when it was replaced by the Malayappa Swami deity. Ugra Srinivasa remains inside the sanctum sanctorum, and is carried out on a procession only one day in a year, on Kaishika Dwadasi, before the sunrise. This deity receives daily abhishekam on behalf of Moolavirat, offering it the name Snapana Beram (Snapana: cleansing)
4. Malayappa Swami or Utsava Beram: Malayappa is the processional deity (Utsava beram) of the temple, and is always flanked by the idols of his consorts, Sridevi and Bhudevi. This deity receives veneration on all festivals, like Brahmotsavams, Kalyanotsavam, Dolotsavam, Vasanthotsavam, Sahasra deepalankarana seva, Padmavati parinyotsavams, pushpapallaki, Anivara asthanam, Ugadi asthanam, etc.
5. Koluvu Srinivasa or Bali Beram: Koluvu Srinivasa represents the Bali Beram. Koluvu Srinivasa is regarded as the guardian deity of the temple, that presides over its financial and economic affairs. Daily Koluvu seva (Koluvu: engaged in) is held in the morning, during which the previous day's offerings, income, expenditures. are notified to this deity, with a presentation of accounts. Panchanga sravanam is also held at the same time, during which that particular day's tithi, sunrise and sunset time, and nakshatra. are notified to Venkateshwara.

=== Festivals ===
In the Venkateswara Temple over 433 festivals are being observed in 365 days of a year suiting the title "Nitya Kalyanam Paccha Toranam" where every day is a festival.

==== Sri Venkateswara Brahmotsavams ====
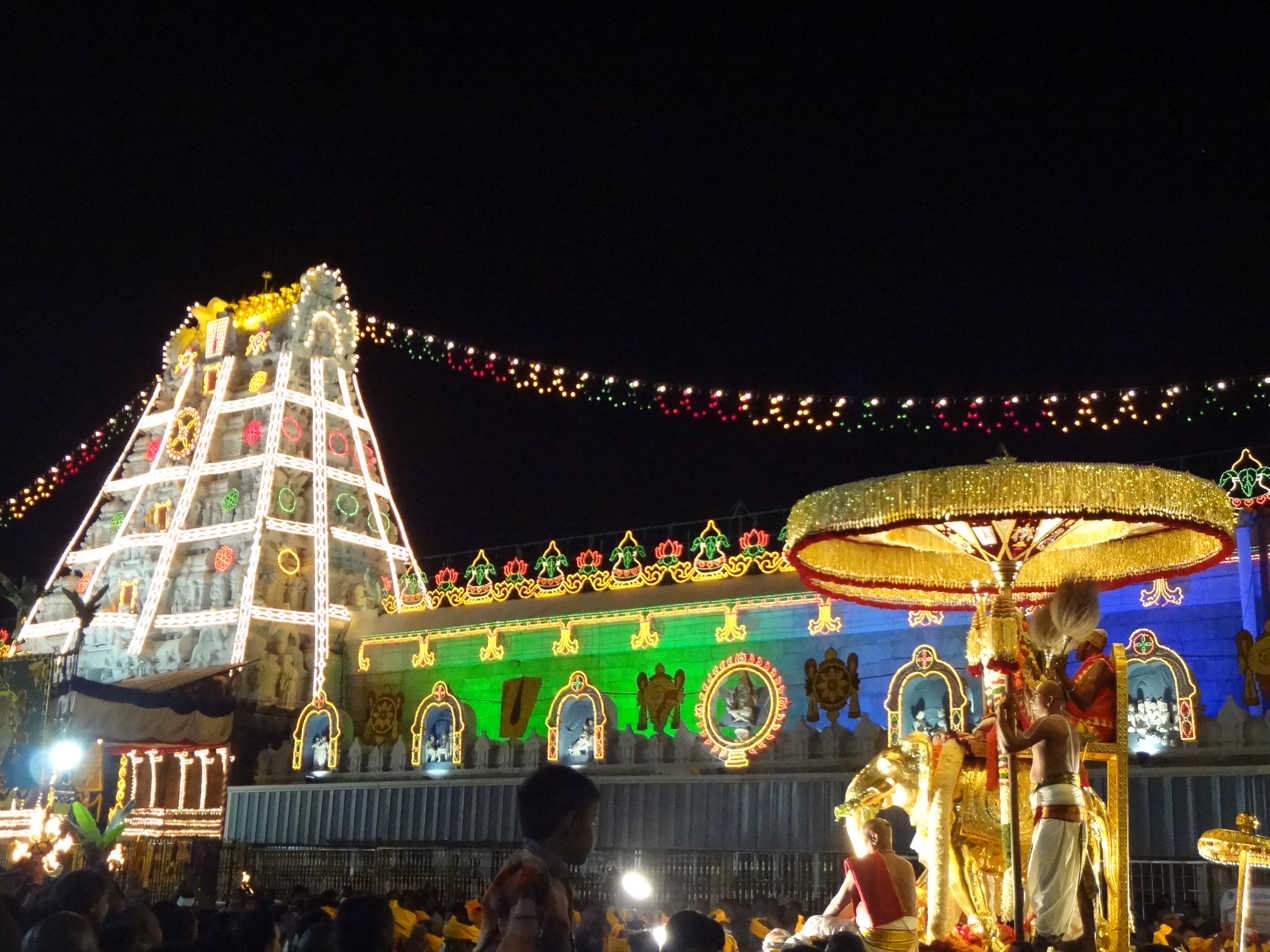
Venkateswara Temple in Brahmotsavams

Sri Venkateswara Brahmotsavams, a nine-day event, which is celebrated every year during month of October, is the major event of Venkateswara Temple. During brahmotsavams the processional deity Malayappa along with his consorts SriDevi and BhuDevi, is taken in a procession in four mada streets around the temple on different vahanams.

==== Vaikuntha Ekadashi ====
Vaikuntha Ekadashi, the day on which it is believed that Vaikunta Dwarams will be opened. The Tirumala Venkateswara Temple will be flooded with devotees, to have a darshan of Venkateswara through special entrance which encircles inner sanctum called "Vaikunta Dwaram".

==== Rathasapthami ====
Ratha Saptami, is another festival, celebrated during February, when Venkateswara's processional deity (Malayappa) is taken in a procession around the temple on seven different vahanams starting from early morning to late night.

== Hymns ==
The Venkateswara Suprabhatam is the first and pre-dawn prayer performed to Venkateswara at Sayana Mandapam, within the inner sanctum of the Tirumala Temple. 'Suprabhatam' is a Sanskrit term, which literally means 'morning salutations', and is meant to wake up the deity from his celestial sleep. The Venkateswara Suprabhatam hymns were composed by Prathivadhi Bhayankaram Annangaracharya during the 13th century, and consist of 70 slokas in four parts, including Suprabhatam (29), Stotram (11), Prapatti (14), and Mangalasasanam (16).

The Dayashataka, a Sanskrit work containing ten decads, was composed by the philosopher Vedanta Desika in praise of the deity.

Tallapaka Annamacharya (Annamayya), the poet saint of the 14th century, one of the greatest Telugu poets and a great devotee of Venkateswara, had sung 32,000 songs in praise of Venkateswara. All his songs, which are in Telugu and Sanskrit, are referred to as Sankirtanas and are classified as Sringara Sankirtanalu and Adhyatma Sankirtanalu.

== Temples ==
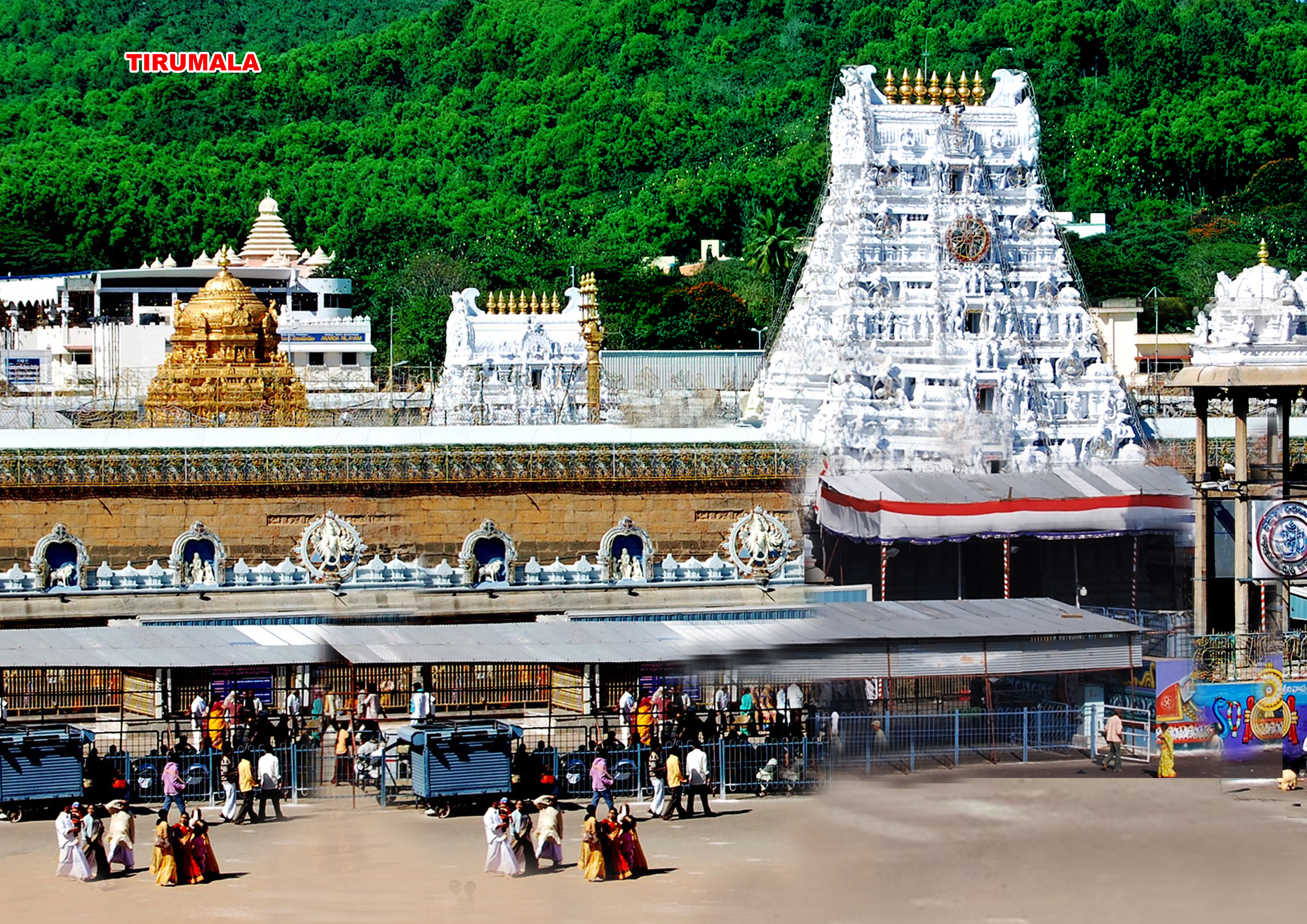
Venkateswara Temple, Tirumala

The most prominent shrine of Venkateswara is Venkateswara Temple situated at Tirumala, a suburb of Tirupati.

Venkateswara is also the primary deity at the following temples:

- Venkateswara Temple, Dwaraka Tirumala, Andhra Pradesh.
- Venkateswara Temple, Vadapalle, East Godavari, Andhra Pradesh.
- Sri Lakshmi Padmavathi Sametha Sri Venkateswara Swamy Temple, Guntur, Andhra Pradesh.
- Prasanna Venkateswara Temple, Appalayagunta, Andhra Pradesh.
- Srungara Vallabha Swamy Temple, Tholi Tirupati, Peddapuram Mandal, Kakinada district
- Venkatachalapathy Temple, Thiruvananthapuram, Kerala.
- Sri Venkatesa Perumal Temple, Tiruppur, Tamil Nadu.
- Narapura Venkateswara Temple, Kadapa, Andhra Pradesh.
- Kalyana Venkateswara Temple, Narayanavanam, Andhra Pradesh.
- Sri Venkataramana Temple, Udupi, Karnataka.
- Balaji Temple, Nandyal, Andhra Pradesh.
- Sri Srinivasa Perumal Temple, Singapore
- Sri Venkateswara Temple, North Carolina, United States.
- Hindu Temple of Atlanta, Georgia, United States.
- Malibu Hindu Temple, California, United States.
- Sri Venkateswara Temple, Pittsburgh, United States.
- Sri Venkateswara Temple, New Jersey, United States.
- Shri Venkateswara (Balaji) Temple, Tividale, United Kingdom.

== See also ==
- Padmavathi
- Vakula Devi
- Perumal
- Sri Venkateswara Mahatyam
- Sri Tirupati Venkateswara Kalyanam
