= Vishveshwara =

Vishveshwara, one of the names of Shiva, is also an Indian surname. Notable people with this name include:

- C. V. Vishveshwara (1938–2017), Indian black hole physicist, married to Saraswathi, father of Smitha
- Saraswathi Vishveshwara (born 1946), Indian biophysicist, married to C. V., mother of Smitha
- Smitha Vishveshwara (born 1974), Indian quantum condensed matter physicist, daughter of C. V. and Saraswathi

== See also ==
- Gaga Bhatt, 17th century Brahmin scholar born as Vishveshvara Bhatta
- Devanahalli Fort, near Bangalore, containing a temple formerly called Kashi Vishveshwara
- Sri Vishweshwara Temple, Yellur
