= Srimushnam =

- Town
- Location in Tamil Nadu, India Srimushnam (India)
- Coordinates: 11°24′N 79°24′E
- Country: India
- State: Tamil Nadu
- District: Cuddalore
- Taluk: Srimushnam

Area
  - Total: 15.72 km^{2} (6.07 sq mi)

Population (2011)
  - Total: 13,971
  - Density: 888.7/km^{2} (2,302/sq mi)

Languages
  - Official: Tamil
- Time zone: UTC+5:30 (IST)
- Vehicle registration: TN-91

Srimushnam is a town panchayat, and the headquarters of Srimushnam taluk, in Cuddalore district, Tamil Nadu, India. The town is sacred to Hindus and Buddhists. It is one of the eight Svayam Vyakta Ksetras of Vaishnavism, and is known for Bhu Varaha Swamy temple, which is dedicated to Varaha, the boar-avatar of Vishnu, and his consort, Lakshmi. The Bhuvaraha temple has been visited by Madhva saint Sri Vadiraja Tirtha in sixteenth century and is written in his work Tirtha Prabandha. Jagadguru Madhvacharya visited Bhuvaraha temple many times and took even Chaturmasya deeksha here. During his Chaturmasya deeksha he created a Dhanda Tirtha, a pond with stick which can be seen even today.

== Geography ==
Srimushnam is within Srimushnam taluk, which is in the southern part of Cuddalore district. It covers 15.72 square kilometres (6.07 sq mi) of land in the southwestern part of the taluk, near the border with Ariyalur district. Nearby large settlements include Virudhachalam, 18 km (11 mi) to the northwest, and Chidambaram, 30 km (19 mi) to the east. It is located 55 km (34 mi) southwest of Cuddalore, the district headquarters, and 200 km (120 mi) southwest of the state capital of Chennai. The town is within the drainage basin of the Vellar River.

== Demographics ==
In 2011 Srimushnam had a population of 13,971 people living in 3,277 households. 7,020 (50.2%) of the inhabitants were male, while 6,951 (49.8%) were female. 1,448 children in the town, about 10.4% of the population, were at or below the age of 6. 68.0% of the population was literate, with the male rate of 74.4% higher than the female rate of 61.6%. Scheduled Castes and Scheduled Tribes accounted for 18.9% and 0.56% of the population, respectively.

== Landmarks ==
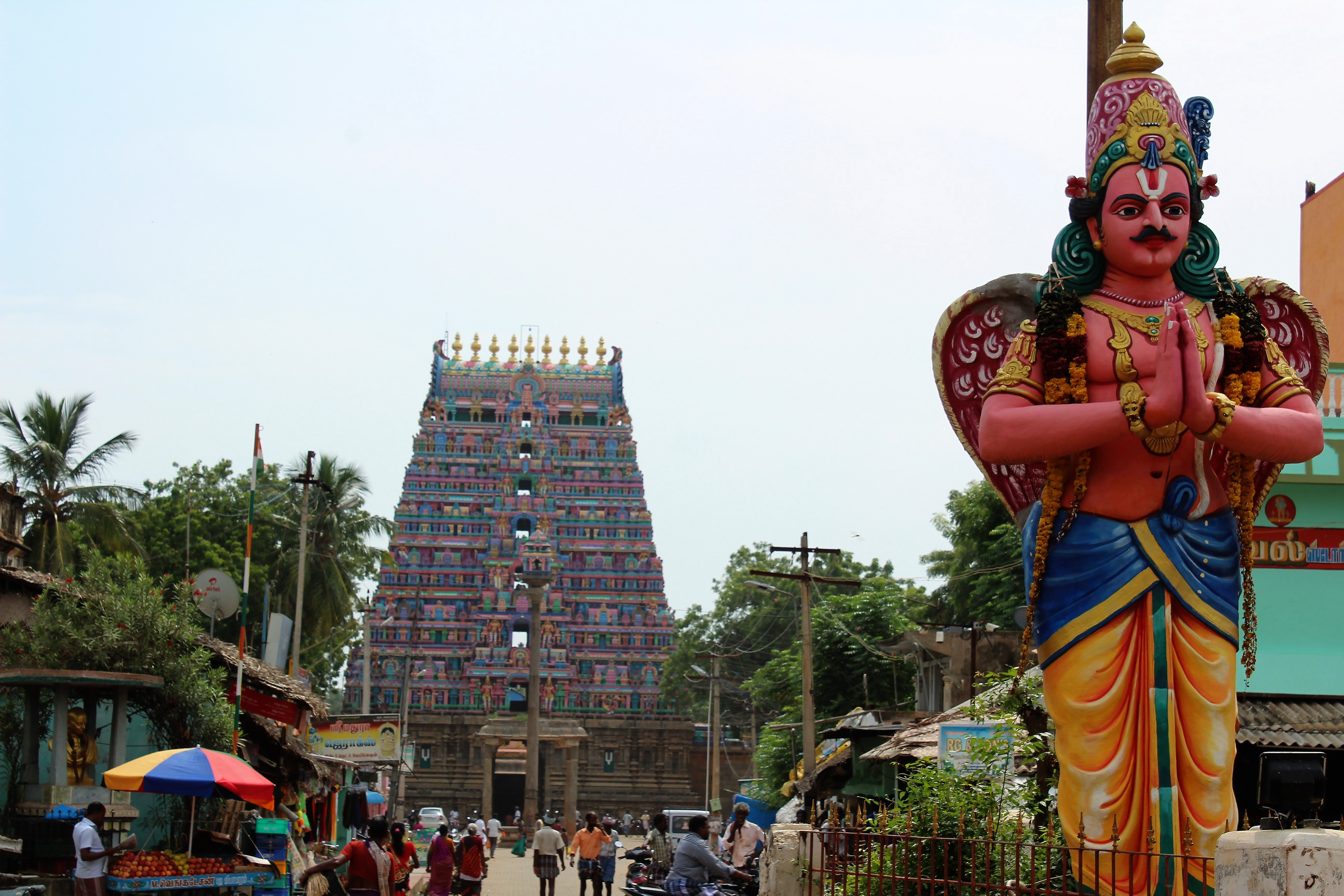
Srimushnam Bhuvarahaswamy temple

Bhu Varaha Swamy temple is a Hindu temple, located at Srimushnam, in the South Indian state of Tamil Nadu. Constructed in the Chola style of architecture, the temple is dedicated to Varaha (Bhu Varaha Swamy), the boar-avatar of the god Vishnu and his consort Lakshmi as Ambujavalli Thayar.

The temple had contributions from Medieval Cholas of the 10th century with later expansions by Thanjavur Nayak king Achuthappa Nayak. A granite wall surrounds the temple, enclosing all the shrines and the temple tanks. There is a seven-tiered rajagopuram, the temple’s gateway tower.

Six daily rituals and three yearly festivals are held at the temple, of which the Chariot festival, celebrated during the Tamil month of Vaikasi (April–May), being the most prominent. The festival also symbolises Hindu-Muslim unity in the region – the flag of the chariot is provided by Muslims; they take offerings from the temple and present to Allah in the mosques. The temple is maintained and administered by the Hindu Religious and Endowment Board of the Government of Tamil Nadu.
