= Navapashanam temple =

Navagraha temple in Tamil Nadu

Navapashanam Temple
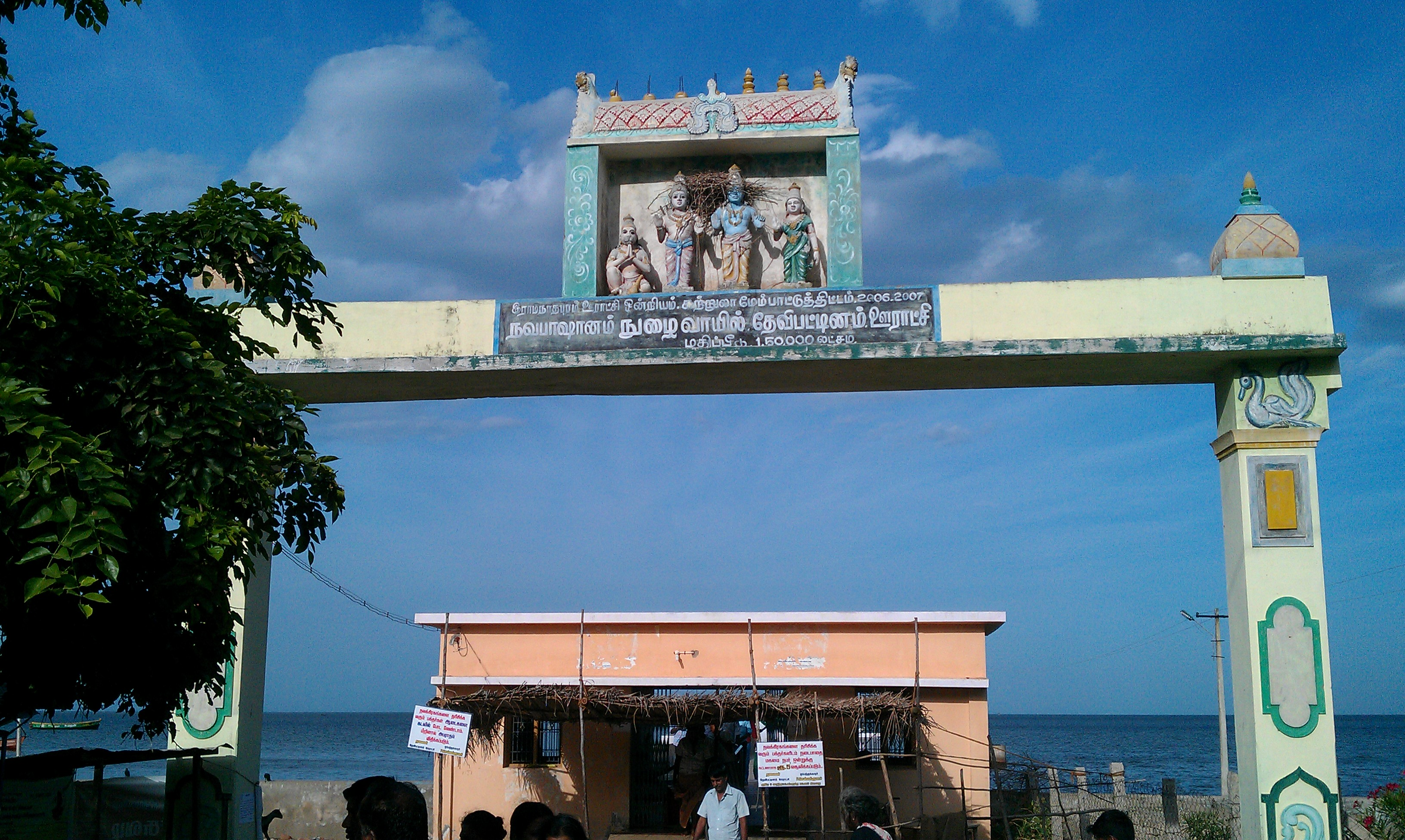

- Location in Tamil Nadu

Religion
- Affiliation: Hinduism
- District: Ramanathapuram
- Deity: Navagrahas

Location
- Location: Devipattinam
- State: Tamil Nadu
- Country: India
- Interactive map of Navapashanam Temple
- Coordinates: 9°28′53″N 78°53′55″E

Navapashanam temple is a Hindu temple dedicated to Navagrahas, the nine planetary deities, located in Devipattinam, the South Indian state of Tamil Nadu. It is a Hindu pilgrimage centre located in the Bay of Bengal. As per Hindu legend, the nine mud images of the planetary deities, have been believed to have built by Rama, an avatar of Vishnu.

The temple is a famous pilgrimage centre in the region where pilgrims perform rites for their forefathers. It is also a part of popular tourist circuit in the region along with the Ramanathaswamy Temple at Rameswaram and Adi Jagannatha Perumal Temple at Thiruppullani. The temple was originally maintained and administered by the Ramanathapuram Samasthanam Devasthanam under the Hereditary Trustee of the Queen of Ramanathapuram until now and controlled by the Department of HR & CE, Government of Tamil Nadu.

== Legend ==
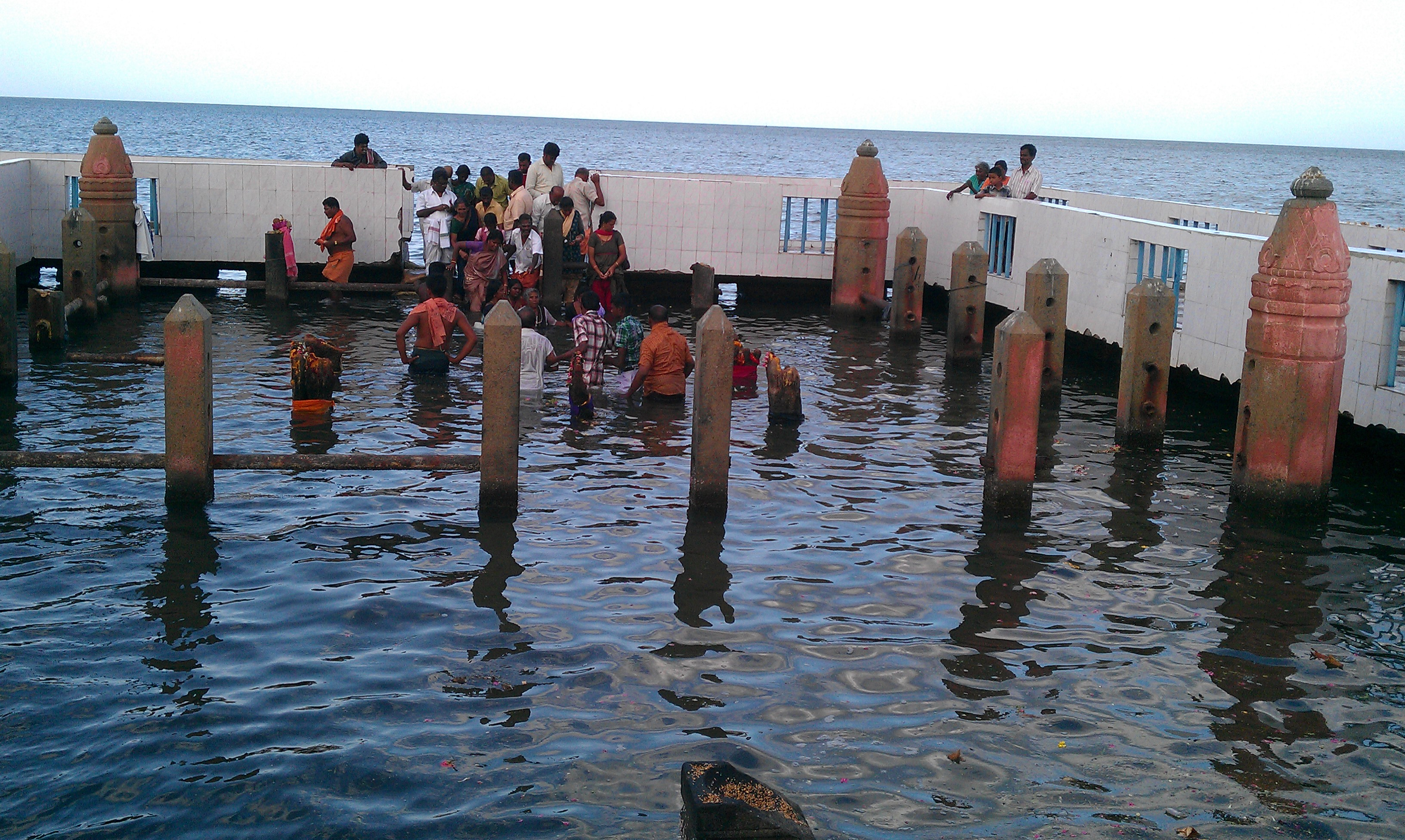
Image of the Navagrahas in the Bay

As per Hindu legend, Ravana, a king, obtained boons from Brahma that he should be killed by any celestial deity or gods. To slay the demon, Vishnu took a human avatar Rama. Ravana came to the forest where Rama and Sita were staying incognito and abducted her. Rama was trying to build a bridge to Lanka to relieve his wife Sita from Ashokavana, where Ravana held her hostage. The bridge was proposed to be built from Dhanushkodi, the nearest point to reach Lanka. Rama started doing pooja seeking favours from Hindu god Ganesha, as is done first during any Hindu religious worship. The place where he did the worship is believed to be the Vinayagar temple at Uppur. The second step for Hindu worship ritual is the Navagraha pooja, worshipping the nine planetary deities, which was done at Navapashanam. Rama is believed to have installed the Navagrahas with his own hands with the clay from the place.

== Architecture ==
Navapashanam is located in Devipattinam, a town located 66 km (41 mi) on the East Coast Road. The nine image of the planetary deities is located in a matrix arrangement in the Bay of Bengal. There is an entrance arch on the shores and a pathway 100 yd (91 m) long leads to the sanctum. There is a pathway and four stepways leading to the waters in the four cardinal directions. There are nine stones planted in square plan in cardinal directions with the stone at the center indicating the Sun surrounded by eight other planets. These stones are believed to have been installed by Ram. The village also houses a temple for Devi following the legend of killing the buffalo demon Mahishasura and hence the place is called Devipattinam.

== Festivals ==
The temple was originally maintained and administered by the Sivaganga Devasthanam until 2012, when it was taken up by the Hindu Religious and Endowment Board of the Government of Tamil Nadu. The actual handover happened in December 2015 after court intervention. The temple is open from 4:30 a.m. to 6:30 pm on all days. The major festivals celebrated in the temple are the ten-day Aadi Amavasai, the full moon day on the Tamil month of Aadi (June - July) and Thai amavasai (New moon day in January) during the Tamil month of Thai (January - February). During these days, there are close to one lakh pilgrims who visit the place. The place is commonly visited by pilgrims doing their rites for their forefathers. It is also a part of popular tourist circuit in the region along with the Ramanathaswamy Temple at Rameswaram and Adi Jagannatha Perumal Temple at Thiruppullani. The practise of offering nine different type of grains specific to each of the nine planets is commonly followed in the temple. Unlike other South Indian temples, where people are not allowed to touch the presiding deities, pilgrims can do their own worship on the images.

== Power of Navapashanam ==
Navapashanam is a legendary alchemical preparation in the South Indian Siddha tradition, most famous for its use in the creation of the Lord Murugan idol at the Palani Murugan Temple. The word is derived from the Sanskrit nava (nine) and pashanam (poison or mineral).

=== 1. The Alchemical Mixture ===
According to tradition, the legendary Siddhar Bogar created this unique amalgam by combining nine specific "poisonous" substances. Through advanced alchemical processes, these toxins were purified and transformed into a solidified, stone-like material with potent healing properties. While historical recipes vary or remain guarded secrets, they often include: Minerals/Metals: gold, silver, iron, lead, tin, zinc, copper, and mercury. Herbal Extracts: A blend of thousands of rare medicinal herbs.

=== 2. Spiritual and Medicinal Significance ===
The Palani Idol: The idol at Palani is believed to be the only original Navapashanam idol. It is said that any substance (like milk or honey) poured over the idol during ritual baths (Abhishekam) absorbs medicinal properties from the Navapashanam and becomes a curative elixir. Healing Properties: Devotees believe it can cure complex diseases and balance the body's energy systems (doshas). Cosmic Connection: The nine substances are often linked to the Navagrahas (nine planets) to channel cosmic energy into the human body.

=== 3. Navapashanam Temple (Devipattinam) ===
In addition to the alchemical substance, "Navapashanam" also refers to a specific pilgrimage site in Devipattinam. The Ritual: Nine stones, representing the planetary deities, are installed in the sea. Legend: It is believed that Lord Rama installed these stones himself to seek the blessings of the planets before his battle with Ravana.
