= Udupi Power Plant =

Power station in Karnataka, India

- Location of the Udupi Power Plant
- Country: India
- Location: Padubidri, Udupi.
- Coordinates: 13°9′35″N 74°48′0″E
- Construction began: 2008; 18 years ago
- Commission date: March 2012; 14 years ago
- Owners: Adani Power; Lanco Infratech
- Operator: Udupi Power Corporation Limited (subsidiary of Adani Power)

Thermal power station
- Primary fuel: Coal

Power generation
- Units operational: 2 X 600 MW
- Nameplate capacity: 1,200 MW

Udupi Power Plant is a coal based thermal power station in Karnataka, India, established in 2008. It is located to the north of Mangalore, west of Belmannu, and just to the northeast of Padubidri in the village of Yellur, Udupi district, close to the Shambhavi River, roughly 7 or 8 km (4.3 or 5.0 mi) from the coast from where the imported coal for the power plant is transported to plant through rail line.

The power station caused controversy as it was built within Kudremukh National Park and caused protests.

== Installed capacity ==
Unit	Capacity (In MW)	Date of Commissioning	status
Phase 1	2x600	March 2012	Commissioned
Phase 2	2x800	Under Construction	EC received

It has installed capacity of 1200 MW (2x600). The plant became fully operational in September 2012.

The plant is operated by Udupi Power Corporation Limited which is a subsidiary of Lanco Infratech. Earlier the plant was owned by Nagarjuna Power Corporation Limited.

In August 2014, Lanco Infratech has agreed to sell this power plant to Adani Power for Rupees 6,000 crores. The deal finally concluded in April, 2015.

Adani power proposed phase 2 at the same site for 2×800 MW and received environment clearance from MoEF
