= Vanamamalai Perumal Temple =

Perumal temple in Tirunelveli district, Tamil Nadu, India

Sri Vanamamalai Perumal Temple
- Thiruvaramangai
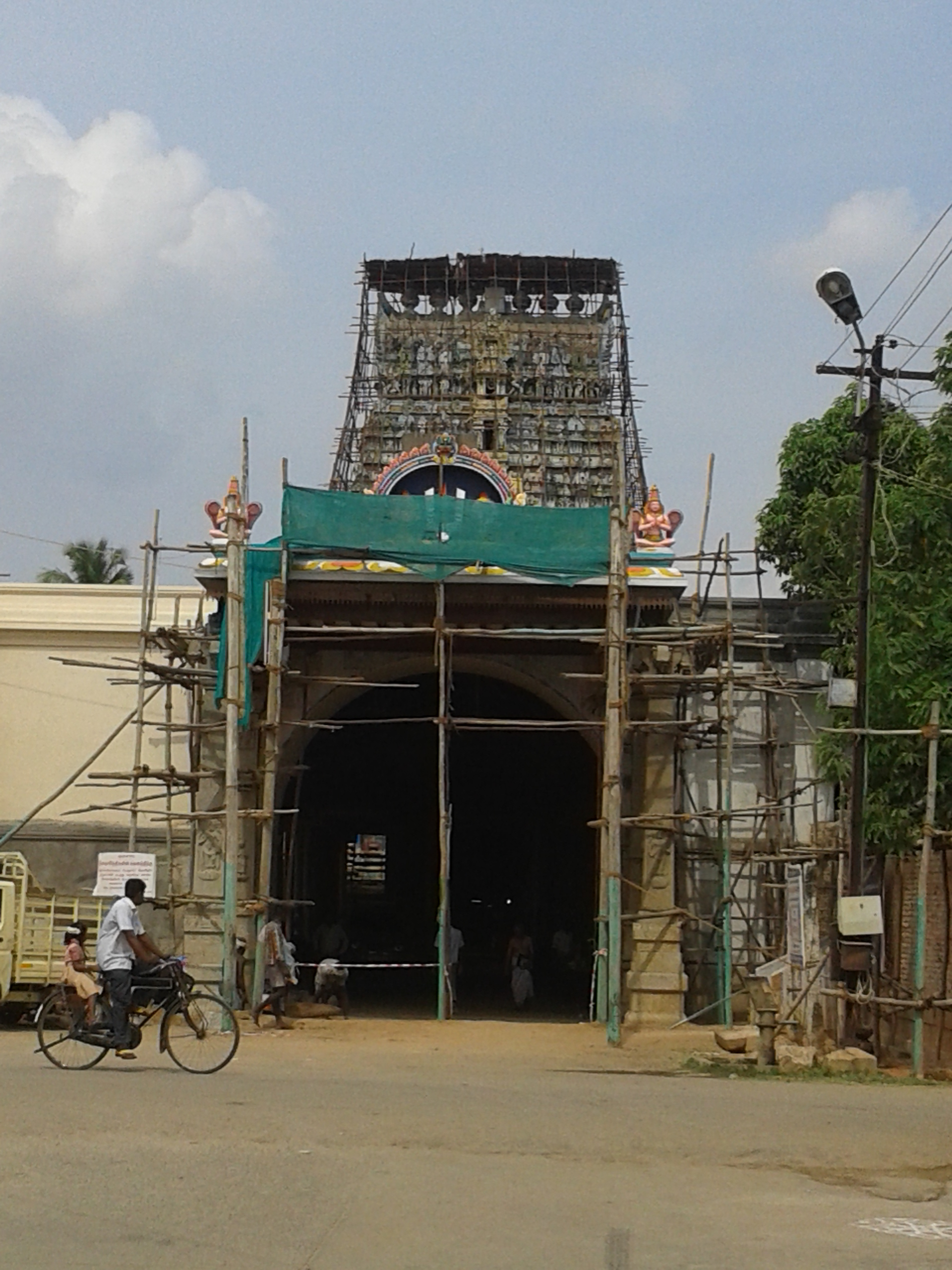

- Location in Tamil Nadu

Religion
- Affiliation: Hinduism
- District: Tirunelveli
- Deity: Thothadrinathan(Vishnu) Varamangai(Lakshmi)
- Features: Tower: Nandhavarthana Vimanam

Location
- Location: Nanguneri
- State: Tamil Nadu
- Country: India
- Coordinates: 8°29′30.9″N 77°39′26.5″E

Architecture
- Type: Dravidian architecture

The Vanamamalai Perumal Temple, also known as Arulmigu Sree Vanamamalai Totatri Perumal Temple, is a Hindu temple dedicated to the god Vishnu, in Vanamamalai or Totadrikshetram (Nanguneri), Tamil Nadu, India on the banks of Thamiraparani river. Constructed in the Dravidian style of architecture, the temple is glorified in the Nalayira Divya Prabandham, the early medieval Tamil canon of the Alvar saints from the 6th–9th centuries CE. It is one of the 108 Divya Desams shrines dedicated to Vishnu. Vishnu is worshipped here as Vanamalai Perumal and his consort Lakshmi as Varamangai. The temple is believed to have been built by the Pandyas, with later contributions from Vijayanagara kings and Madurai Nayaks. The temple covers an area of 5 acres (20,000 m^{2}) and has a five-tiered temple tower.

The temple is one of the eight Svayambu Kshetrams, the eight temples associated with Vishnu, that manifested on its own. Vanamamalai is believed to have appeared to Adishesha and Garuda. Six daily rituals and a dozen yearly festivals are held at the temple, of which the chariot festival, celebrated during the Tamil month of Chittirai (March–April), is the most prominent. The temple is maintained and administered by the Vanamamalai Mutt.

== Legend ==
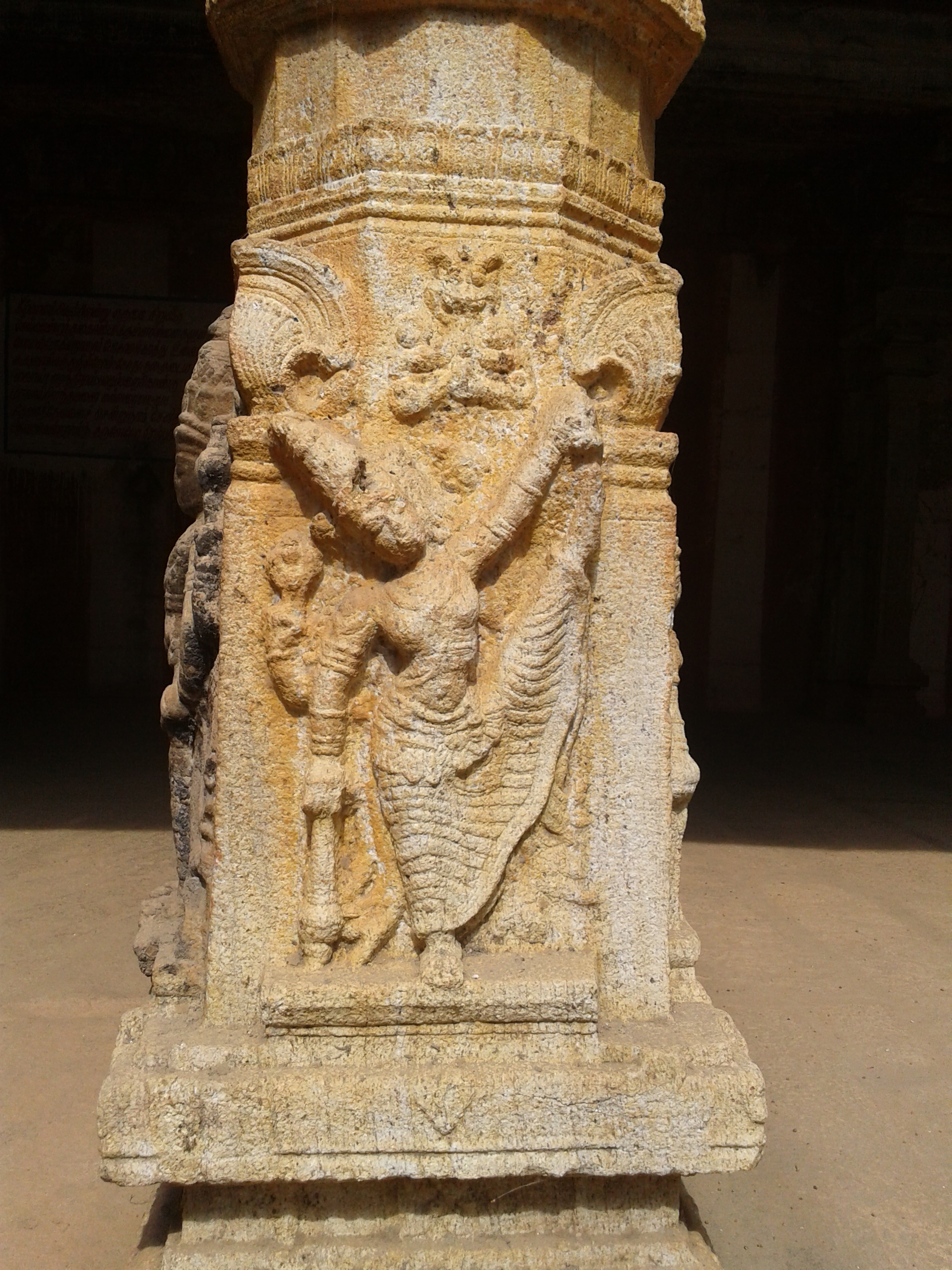
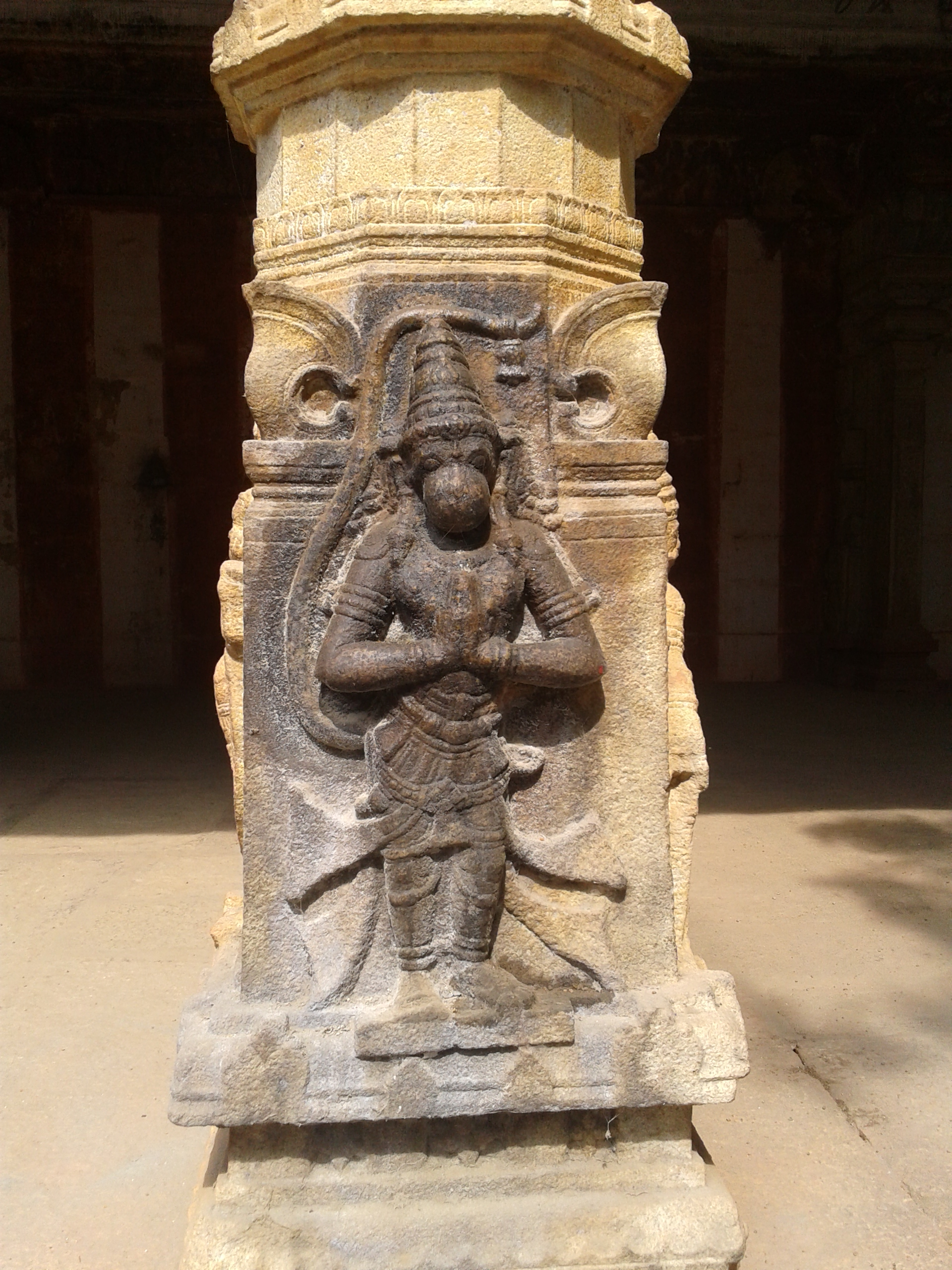
Image of shrines in the temple

The details about the presiding deity finds mention in Brahmananda Purana, Skanda Purana and Narasimha Purana. Sage Narada got the narration about the features of Thodatri and Sargunamangai from Shiva. As per Hindu legend, Lakshmi, the consort of Vishnu, is believed to have been born at this place as Srivaramangai (meaning lady) and hence the place came to be known as Varangunamangai. As per another legend, Adishesha, the serpent performed penance at this place to seek the grace of Vishnu to lay on him. Vishnu was pleased by his devotion and rested on the serpent. Garuda, the eagle-mount of Vishnu, also performed penance and was granted a wish to be guarding Vaikuntha, the abode of Vishnu.

As per local legend, a childless king named Kaaarya worshiped Vishnu at this place. Vishnu directed him to Nanguneri under the earth. The king dug up the earth to see blood oozing from the place. To stop the blood, the king was asked to perform ablution on the presiding deity with oil every day. Blessed with children, the king constructed the temple.

== History ==
The temple has many inscriptions, the earliest of which is from 1236 CE. The inscription is from the period of Sundara Pandya I indicates a gift from him on the occasion of Adi Puram. Another inscription from 1275 from Kulasekara I indicates the details of tax collection in the region. The inscription on the Eastern Gopuram from the period of Sundara Pandya II in 1284 indicates gift of land to the temple. The gift of Vikrama Pandya III is inscribed on the northern wall in 1299. A gift of money to sculpt the image of Sadagopar in 1305 is found in the Eastern wall in the second precinct. From the Vijayanagara rulers, the temple came under the administration of kings of Travancore. A sanyasi named Pushpanjali was entrusted with the donations from the kings. During 1447, the temple came under the administration of Vanamamalai Mutt. The first pontiff of the temple arranged for the installation of the idol of the consort of Vanamamalai from Tirupathi. The Namboodris were also replaced by the priests from Tirupathi during the period. During the 17th century, the then pontiff sought the help of the ruling Naik king to resolve local disputes. During 1794, the Nawab of Carnatic, Abdul Umra, endowed extensive lands to the Mutt.

The presiding deity is called Devapiran as he is believed to have married Varamangai, the daughter of the pontiff of Vanamamalai Mutt. The temple is maintained and administered by the pontiff in modern times.

== Architecture ==
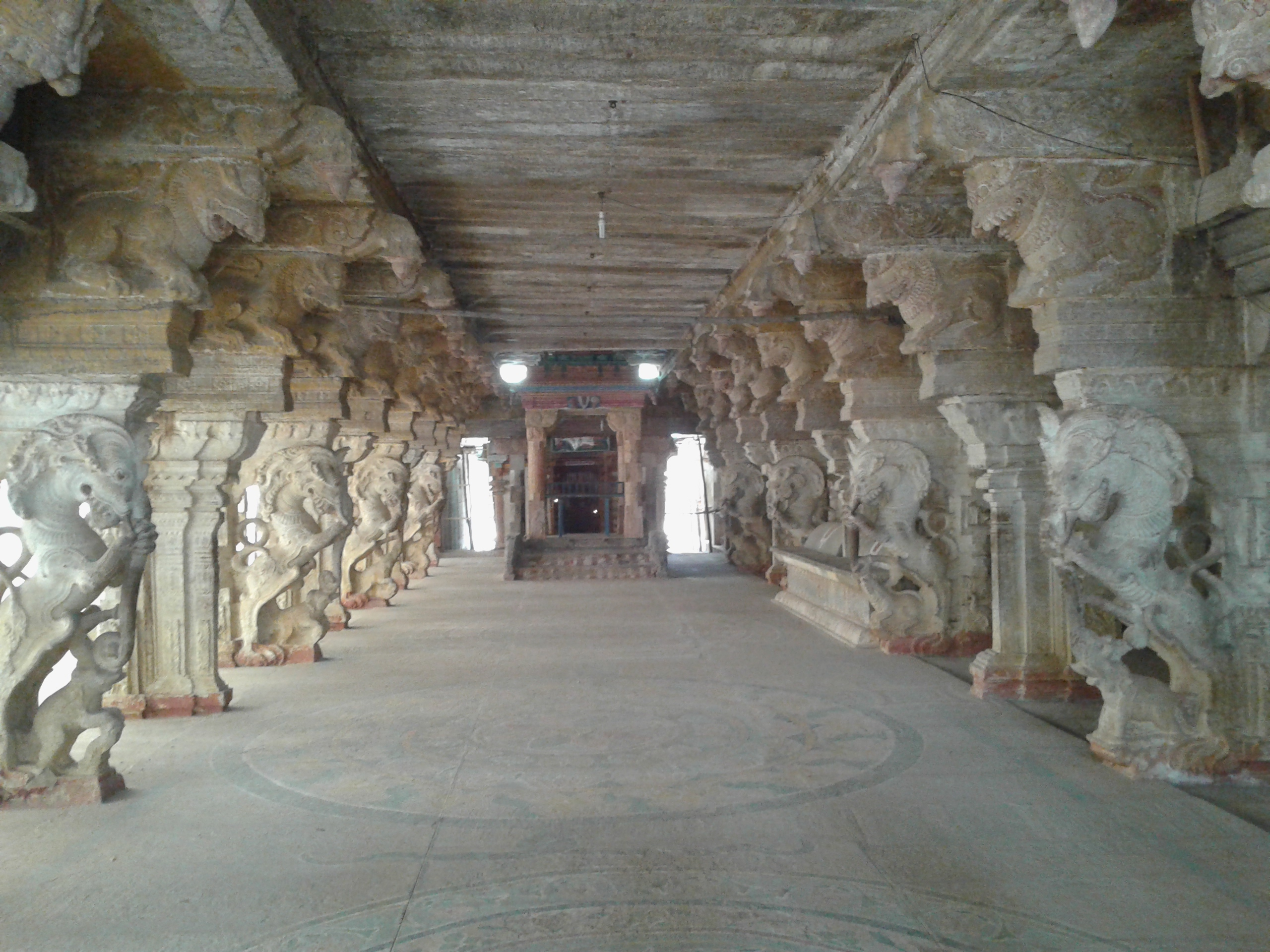
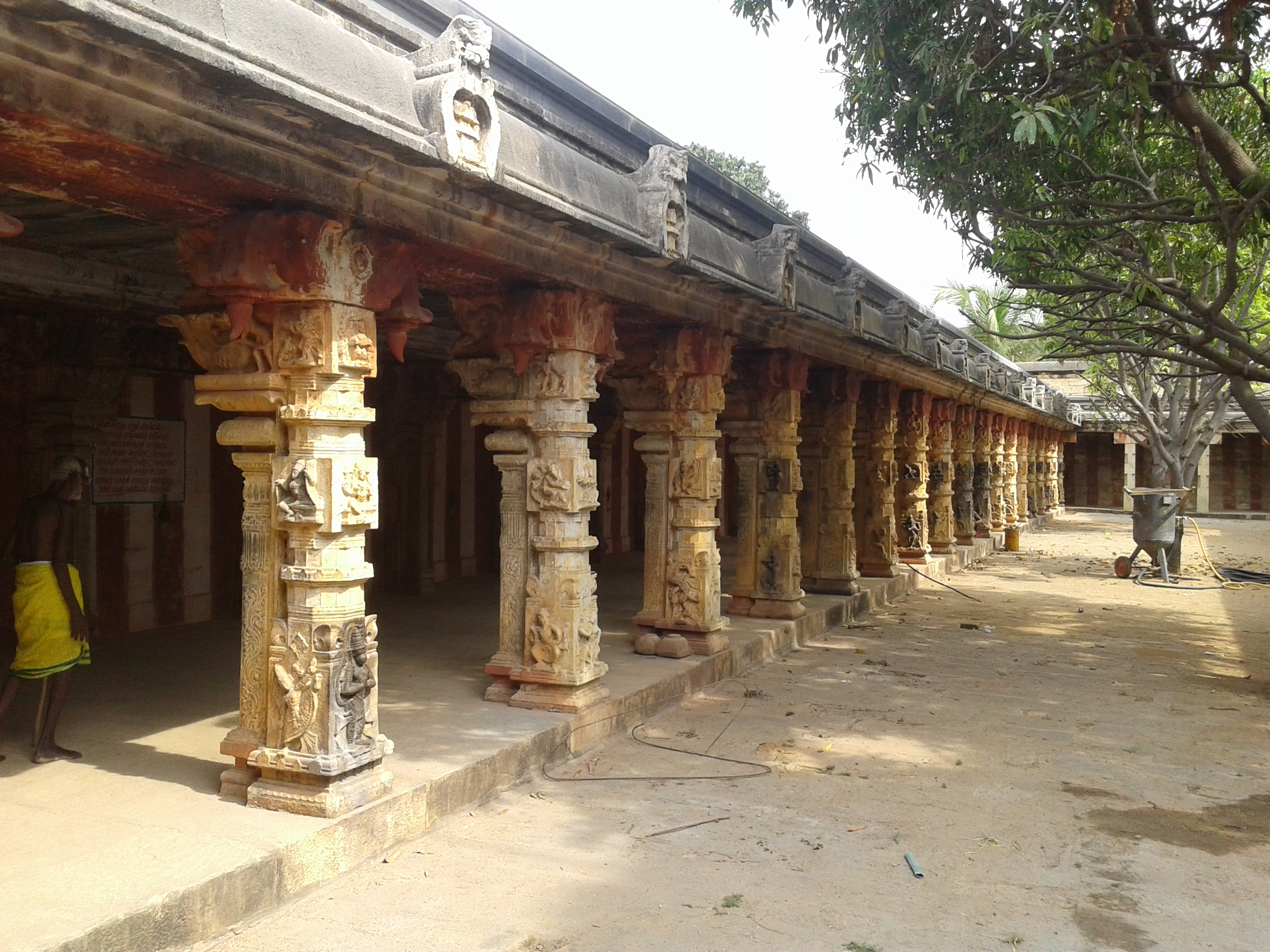
Image of shrines in the temple

The Timeless Stone Pillar Corridors of Vanamamalai Thothadri Perumal Temple.

The temple has a large five-tiered gopuram (gateway tower) and a large temple compound having two prakarams (closed precincts of a temple). There are various pillared halls in the temple. The presiding deity, Vanamamalai Perumal is seen seated on the Adisesha, the serpent deity. Sridevi and Bhoodevi, the two consorts of Perumal are seen on either sides of the presiding deity. The shrine of the presiding deity is located axial to the gateway tower and approached through Ardhamandapam and Mahamandapam, pillared halls. There are three precincts in the temple, with the shrine of Thayar located in the second precinct. There is a festival hall in the second precinct in the temple facing South that has sculpted pillars indicating various legends of the Puranas. The most notable of them being a legend of Mahabharata where Bhima attacks a lion legged person with his club. The second precinct has pillared halls that has smaller sculpted representation indicating various avatars of Vishnu.

== Religious importance ==
The temple is considered one of the eight Sywayambu Kshetras of Vishnu where presiding deity is believed to have manifested on its own. Seven other temples in the line are Srirangam Ranganathaswamy temple, Bhu Varaha Swamy temple, and Tirumala Venkateswara Temple in South India and Saligrama, Naimisaranya, Pushkar and Badrinath Temple in North India. The temple is revered in Nalayira Divya Prabandham, the 7th–9th century Vaishnava canon, by Nammalvar in ten hymns. The temple is classified as a Divya Desam, one of the 108 Vishnu temples that are mentioned in the book. As per the accounts of the Jeeyar, the head of the Vanamamalai Mutt, Janakapuri in Nepal, where Rama (an avatar of Vishnu) married Sita, also has a place called Nanguneri, similar to the Vanamamalai temple.

== Festivals and religious practices ==
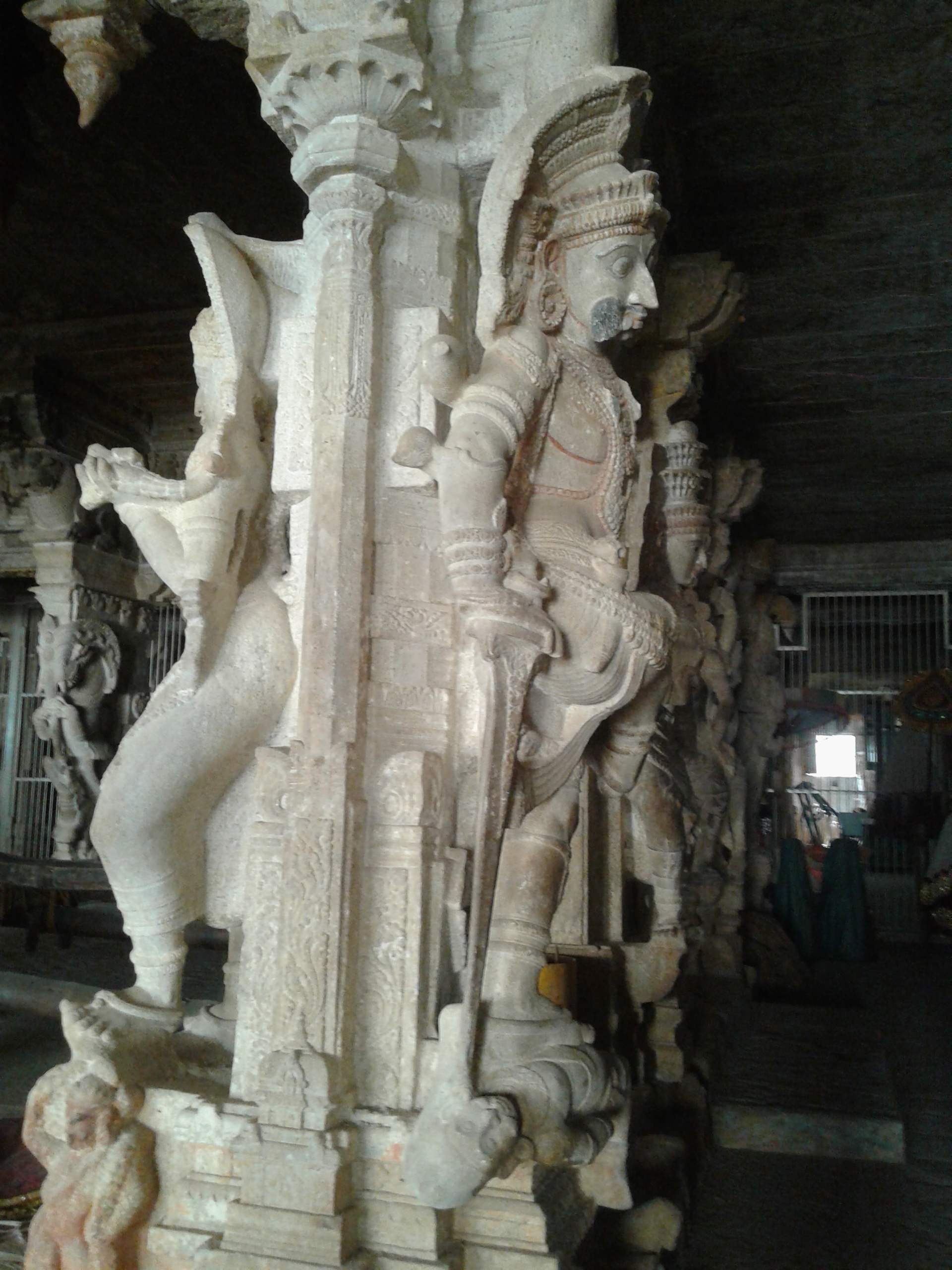
Life size temple sculptures

The temple priests perform the pooja (rituals) during festivals and on a daily basis based on Vaiksana Agama. As at other Vishnu temples of Tamil Nadu, the priests belong to the Vaishnava community, from the Brahmin class. The major festival, the twelve-day Brahmotsavam is celebrated during the Tamil month of Thai (January - February).

Vishnu is considered as alankara priyar (one who prefers decoration), and Shiva as abisheka priyar (one who prefers ablution). Vanamamlai temple is one of the few Vishnu temples where ablution is done for the presiding deity on a daily basis. At around 7 am every day, ablution is performed on the presiding deity with milk, curd and other pooja items. The ghee used for ablution is poured in the oil well in the temple, which is considered sacred. During the festival occasions, the festival idols are brought to the Vanamamalai Mutt located outside the premises of the temple.

== Vanamamalai Mutt ==
Vanamamalai Mutt is a Tenkalai Sri Vaishnava Mutt and the jiyars of mutt are the hereditary trustees of Vanamamalai Perumal temple. The history of Vanamamalai Mutt can be traced back to the time of Manavala Mamunigal's disciples. The first head of the Mutt in 1447 was Vanamamalai Ramanuja Jeer and it has an unbroken continuity of Guru Parambara Jeeyars. The current head is HH Vanamamalai Madhurakavi Ramanuja Jeeyar Swamy. It had Telugu connections and has attracted non-brahmin Naidus from Telugu-speaking families. Today, the mutt has more than 200 subsidiaries mathas called Totadri throughout India.
