= Adi Jagannatha Perumal Temple =

Hindu temple in Tamil Nadu, India

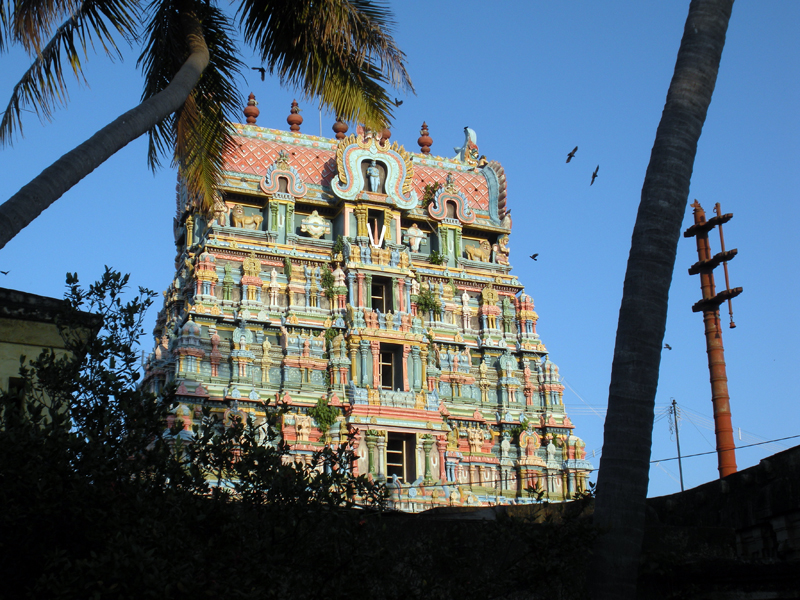

- Location in Tamil Nadu

Religion
- Affiliation: Hinduism
- District: Ramanathapuram
- Deity: Adi Jagannatha Perumal (Vishnu); Padmasini Thayar (Lakshmi); Dharbasayana Ramar (Rama); Pattabhi Ramar (Rama)
- Features: Temple tank: Chakra Theertham

Location
- Location: Tamil Nadu, India
- State: Tamil Nadu
- Country: India
- Interactive map of Adi Jagannatha Perumal Temple
- Coordinates: 9.282745°N 78.824445°E

Architecture
- Type: Dravidian architecture
- Elevation: 35 m (115 ft)

The Adi Jagannatha Temple is a South Indian Hindu temple in Thiruppullani, a village in the outskirts of Ramanathapuram in the South Indian state of Tamil Nadu, is dedicated to the Hindu god Vishnu. It is believed that Rama used grass ('pul' in Tamil as a pillow (thalai annai in Tamil) to sleep and hence the village attained the name Thiruppullani. Constructed in the Cholan style of architecture, the temple is glorified in the Naalayira Divya Prabandham, the early medieval Tamil canon of the Alvar saints from the 6th–9th centuries CE. It is one of the 108 Divya Desam dedicated to Vishnu, who is worshipped as Adi Jagannatha and his consort Lakshmi as Padmasini.

The temple is believed to have been built during the late 8th century CE, with later contributions from Medieval Cholas, later Pandyas, Madurai Nayak kings, Sethupathi Palayam of Ramnad. As per Hindu legend, Rama is believed to have done penance to worship the god of ocean to seek way to Lanka in grass, giving the name Dharbasayanam to the place. The temple is maintained and administered by the Ramanathapuram Samasthan Devasthanam a Trust under the control of the Ramnad Palayam Sethupathi successor and at present Her Highness the Raja Rajeswari Natchiyar as Hereditary Trustee and the accounts were audited by Hindu Religious and Charitable Endowments Department of the Government of Tamil Nadu.

== Legend ==
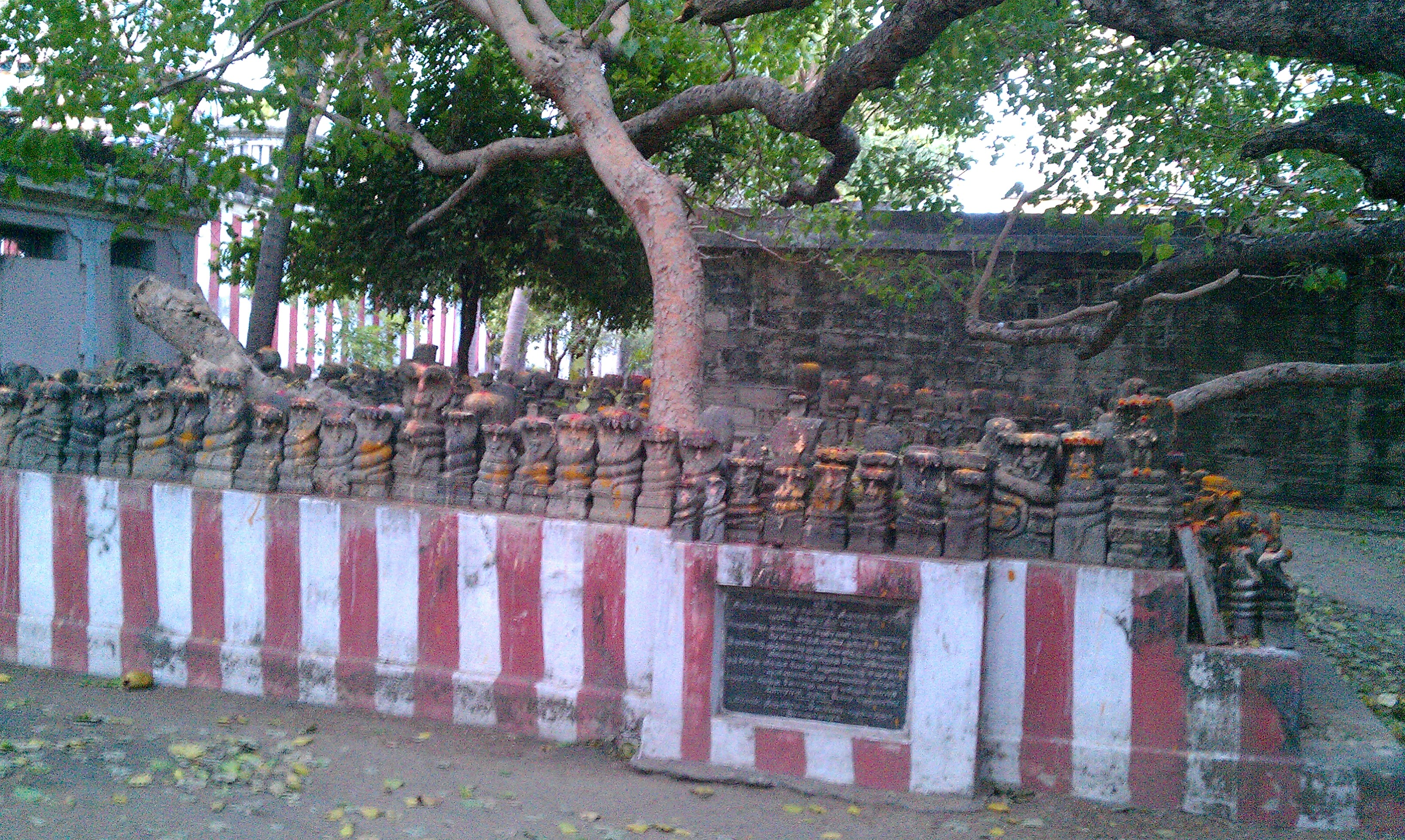
Set of Nagars

As per Hindu legend, Rama in the epic Ramayana prayed to the Samudraraja (God of Ocean) to seek way to reach Lanka. He did a penance lying in Kusa grass (Dharba grass), the act of which is described in Sanskrit as Dharbasayanam.

As per another legend, Dasharatha, the father of Rama, performed different sacrifices and did a lot of penance to obtain the sacred payasam (sweet pudding). He offered it equally to his three wives, resulting in the birth of Rama, Lakshmana, Bharatha and Shatrughna. Following the legend, childless couple perform a worship called nagapradishta (installing a statue of snake god) in the temple. Sweet pudding is offered to childless couple praying for a child. It is believed that Adi Jaganatha bestows a child like Rama when such a worship is performed.

== History ==
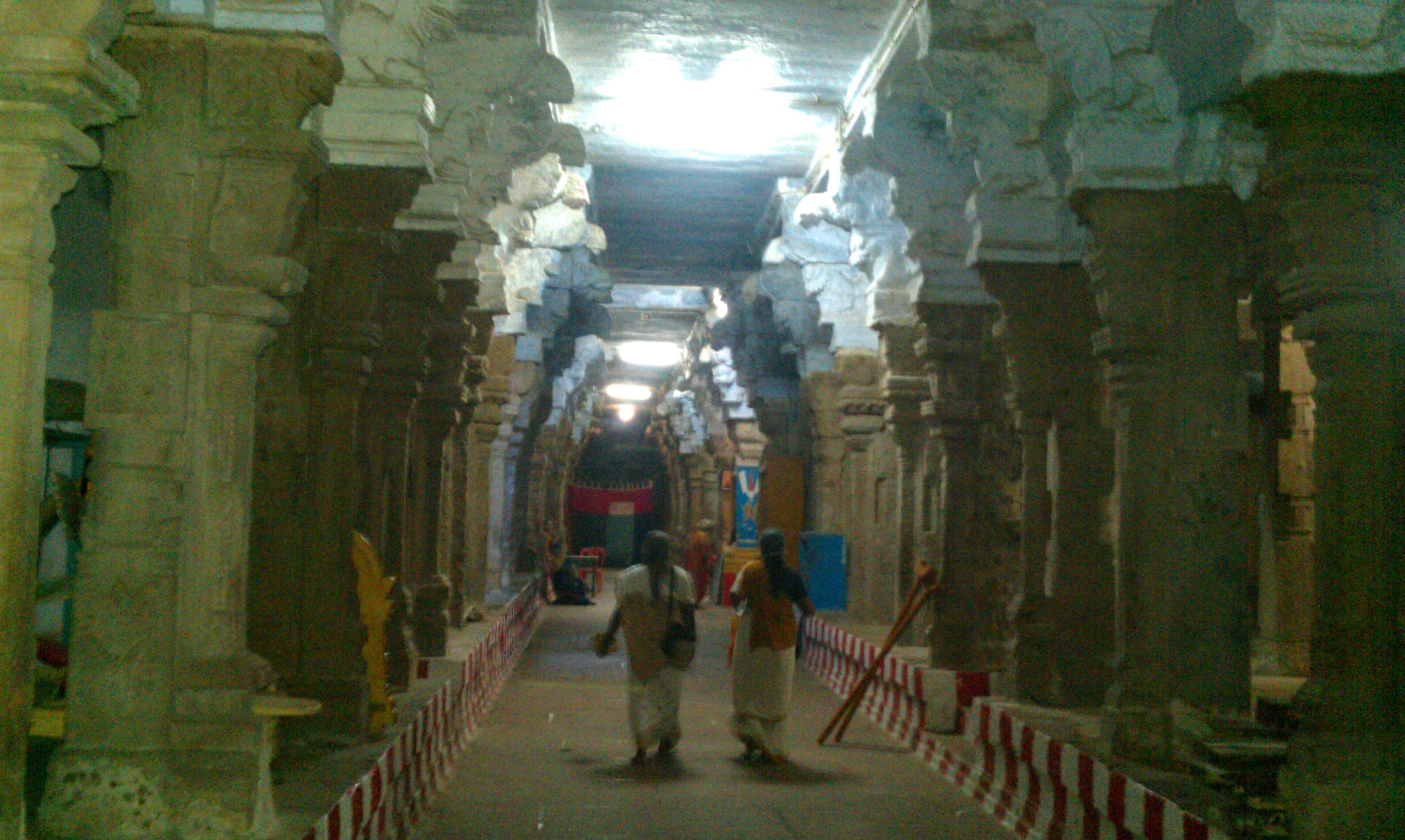
Corridor of the temple

The temple is believed to have been initiated during the Medieval Chola period along with many temples dedicated to Rama. The Chola king Parantaka I named himself "Sangrama Raghava" after his conquest of Sri Lanka, while his son Aditya I was called Kothandarama. Some later Pandya kings also made contributions to the temple. A mutilated inscription in the temple made during the 37th year of Maravarman Sundara Pandyan in 1305 records order of a minister by name Arya Chakravarthi. Historians believe some portions of the temple tower might also have been built by Jaffna kings, who were friends of Pandya Empire and also rulers of Rameswaram. There is one damaged record from 1518 from the period of Mahabali Vanadaraya Naykkar and one another made in 1528 during the reign of Sundarattoludaiyar Mahabali Vanadarayar. There are inscriptions in the temple indicating Arab traders visiting the Pandyan Empire. The traders traded pearl and pepper and in return were allowed to build mosques in the region for their worship. The mosques followed Indian architecture with stone pillars and were called Kallupalli. The temple received lot of contributions from the Vijayanagara period, along with other Vishnu temples in the region. Madhwa sampradaya saint Shree Vadiraja Tirtha have mentioned about Darbashayana Temple in his work Tirtha Prabandha.

== Architecture ==
The temple is located in Thirupullani, a village located 10 km (6.2 mi) from Ramanathapuram and 64 km (40 mi) from Rameswaram. The temple has a five-tiered rajagopuram (gateway tower) facing east. The shrine of Adi Jagannatha houses the image of Adi Jagannatha, Bhudevi and Sri Devi in sitting posture. The consort of Adi Jagannathar is Padmasini, housed in a separate shrine. There is a shrine for Dharbasayana Ramar in a reclining posture. There is a metal image of Krishna from the 13th-century Pandya period Vijayanagara Kings and Madurai Nayak kings. The image depicts Krishna dancing in a snake, a rare historical depiction of Krishna in a metal image.

== Festivals, religious practices and significance ==
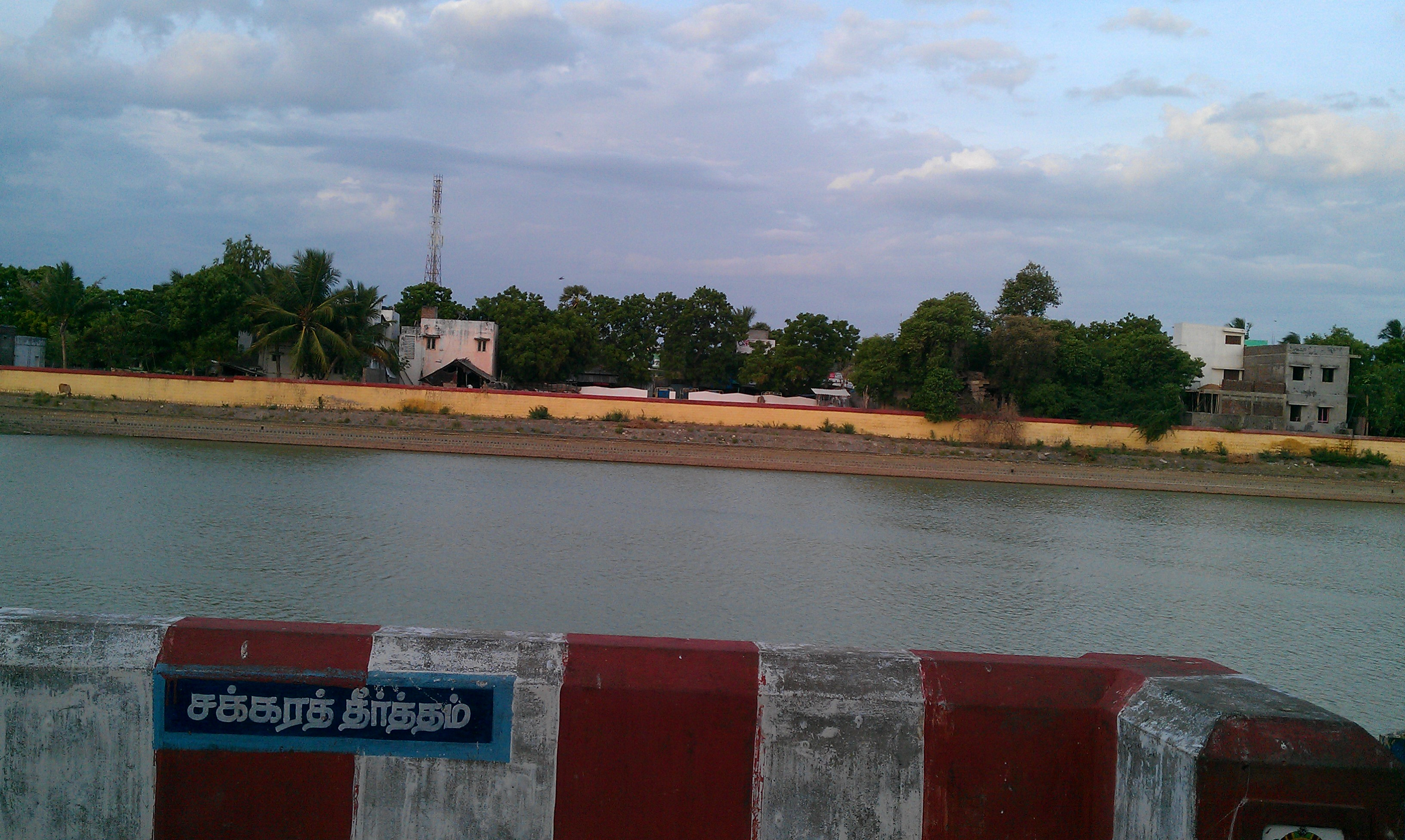
Chakra Theertham, the temple tank

The temple priests perform the pooja (rituals) during festivals and on a daily basis. Like other Vishnu temples of Tamil Nadu, the priests belong to the Vaishnavaite community, a Brahmin sub-caste. The temple rituals are performed six times a day: Ushathkalam at 7 a.m., Kalasanthi at 8:00 a.m., Uchikalam at 12:00 p.m., Sayarakshai at 6:00 p.m., Irandamkalam at 7:00 p.m. and Ardha Jamam at 10:00 p.m. The Vaikhanasa Agama Shastrams and Thengalai Vaishnava traditions are followed in all the temple rituals. Each ritual has three steps: alangaram (decoration), neivethanam (food offering) and deepa aradanai (waving of lamps) for both Adi Jagannatha and Padmasini. During the last step of worship, nagaswaram (pipe instrument) and tavil (percussion instrument) are played, religious instructions in the Vedas (sacred text) are recited by priests, and worshippers prostrate themselves in front of the temple mast. There are weekly, monthly and fortnightly rituals performed in the temple. The two major festivals celebrated in the temple are the Panguni Brahmotsavam for Adi Jagannathar and Rama Navami Utsavam during the Tamil month of Chittirai. Other major festivals celebrated in Vishnu temples in South India like Vaikuntha Ekadashi, Krishna Jayanthi, Pongal and Deepavali, are also celebrated.

The temple is revered in Naalayira Divya Prabandham, the 7th–9th century Vaishnava canon, by Thirumangai Alvar in one hymn. The temple is classified as a Divya Desam, one of the 108 Vishnu temples that are mentioned in the book. The temple is revered in 20 verses of Thirumangai Alvar in his Periya Tirumoli in Naalayira Divya Prabandham. The epic is also described by Kambar in his work Kamba Ramayanam.
