= Sri Vishweshwara Temple, Yellur =

Hindu temple

Shri Vishweshwara Temple
- Mahathobhara Yelluru Shree Vishweshwara Temple
- Location in Karnataka 200

Religion
- Affiliation: Hinduism
- District: Udupi
- Deity: Vishwanath (Shiva)
- Festival: Maha Shivaratri

Location
- Location: Yelluru
- State: Karnataka
- Country: India
- Interactive map of Shri Vishweshwara Temple
- Coordinates: 13°10′52.05″N 74°47′51.43″E

Architecture
- Type: Hindu temple architecture

Website
- www.yelluruvishweshwara.org

Mahathobhara Yelluru Shree Vishweshwara Temple is a Hindu temple dedicated to the god Vishweshwara (Shiva) in the Yellur village of Udupi district in the state of Karnataka, India. Vishweshwara is referred to at least in 12 rock edicts and recorded by the Kaifiyaths.

== History ==
The temple that belongs to the Maagane that comprises Nandikooru (Adve, Ulluru, Kolachuru), Kalathuru, Kutyaru, Padooru, Belapu and Kunjoor, has a rich history of over 1,000 years. The temple has been renovated and inaugurated in grand functions lasting from 4 March 2009 to 12 March 2009.

Devotees here pay their respect to Vishweshwara by offering tender coconut Abhishekham, lit oil lamps and gold coins (pawan). It is believed that the god will grant all their prayers. The story goes that Ullaya got pleased with the penance observed by a devotee who belonged to the Kunda Hegde family and as result he descended from Kashi to Yelluru. It is known as the divine place of Swayambhu Saannidhya.

Vadiraja Tirtha's mention of the temple in Tirtha Prabandha

The Temple was closed after the day's puja, when Vadiraja reached the temple. Vadiraja therefore stood outside the Temple and prayed to Shankara. Maheshwara, pleased by Vadiraja's prayer opened the door and appeared before Vadiraja, and Vadiraja continued his prayers. Suddenly Nandi appeared and obstructed the meeting. Now Vadiraja prayed to Nandi, who was pleased, sat down. Therefore one can see and worship Vishwanatha now standing anywhere in front of Maheshwara. Vadiraja extols Viswanatha in five slokas.

Oh Maheshwara, you hold a strong Trishula Which has slain, powerful demons like Andhakasura You are quite handsome and are three-eyed,

And you possess a shining and powerful Japamala,

Which can wipe out the sins of the devotees.

You are destroyer of Daksadwara

Oh Sambho ! we pray to you. 21

Oh Nagabhushana Sambho!

You are decorated by serpents.

With Ganga on your head You are quite holy and sacred Even saints who are expert musicians Sing of your glory and Praise your valorous acts _

Such as Tripura Vijaya md other glories,

Parvati has set her lovely glance you Oh Viswanatha! we pray to you. 22

All celestials, including Indra Worship your Lotus feet.

You bear half-moon on your head You are Lotus eyed,

Manmatha the God of loye was

Reduced to ashes by your angry look

You are the treasure house of noble

Qualities and deep scholarship

You are far superior to Mahendra

Oh Shankara, we humbly worship you 23

All Yogis like Narada and Sanandana Do sing Md praise your glory,

You are blue-necked Oh mind, please do

Worship the supremely handsome Shankara 24

Oh Tripurari Sambho! Rudrasukta And other Veda Mantras praise your glory.

You are always kind to devotees, who worship you with jasmine and bilva patra You always bless those who seek your help Your matted locks are radiant due to The presence of lustrous moon on your head,

And you are a great benefactor of devotees.

Kindly eradicate our evil thoughts

Oh Shankara, we worship you. 25

Vadiraja now turns to the Bull -vehicle Nandi of Shankara and prays to him in one Sloka.

Oh fair coloured Mahanandi, you are Used as the main vehicle of Shankara And possesses beautiful ears, tall

Homs, feet, stomach, eyes, &face And a majestic hump on your back,

== Architecture ==
The architecture of the temple is unique and considered a classic one in the view of the Tantragama experts. The age-old temple has been considered as the perfect and unique model of the Devaayathana style of architecture.

== Legends ==
Vishveshwara is believed to have emerged from underground respecting the devotion of a Samanta Raja of Kuthyar Dynasty. The linga of Shiva thus emerged and was first understood to have been found by a Koraga mother while she was collecting firewood and leaves in the forest where her son "Yellu" was buried after his untimely death. While cutting the bush she hit the ground and the earth is said to have started bleeding. Scared by the flow of blood she screamed "Oh, Maga Yellu, yei Moolu Ullana?" (meaning 'Oh, my son Yellu, are you here?') in Tulu. In fact it was the "Linga" itself, and it is said that the mark of the wound is still on it. The village was thereafter known from Yelluna Ooru to gradually Yellur.
