= Bhu Varaha Swamy temple =

Hindu temple in Cuddalore

Bhu Varaha Swamy Perumal Temple
- Bhu Varaha Swamy Kovil
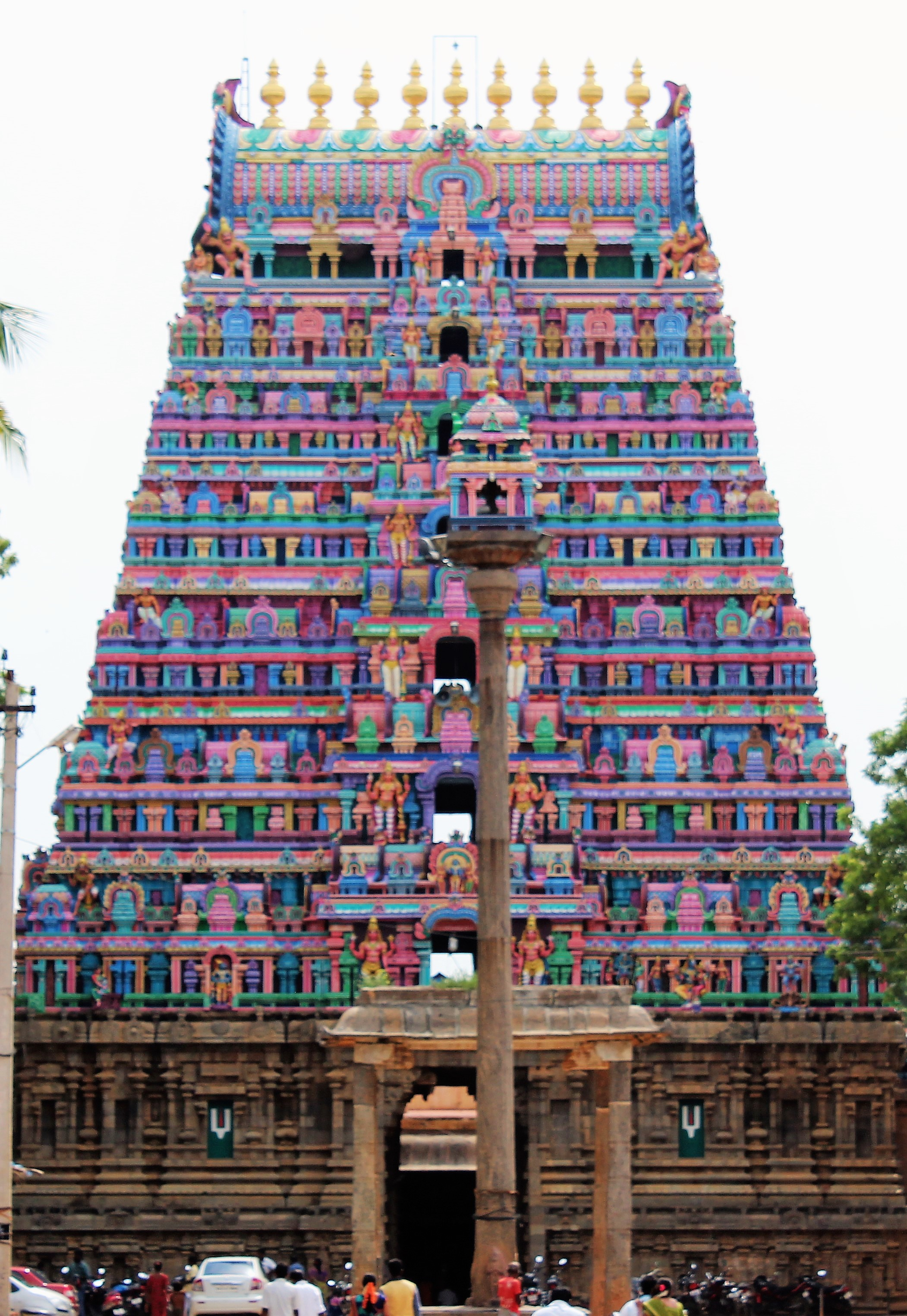

- Location in Tamil Nadu

Religion
- Affiliation: Hinduism
- District: Cuddalore
- Deity: Bhu Varaha Swamy (Varaha); Ambujavalli Thayar (Lakshmi)

Location
- Location: Srimushnam
- State: Tamil Nadu
- Country: India
- Coordinates: 11°24′7″N 79°24′19″E

Architecture
- Type: South Indian architecture
- Creator: Vijayanagara Kings

The Bhu Varaha Swamy temple is a Hindu temple, located at Srimushnam, in the South Indian state of Tamil Nadu. Constructed in the South Indian style of architecture, the temple is dedicated to Varaha (Bhu Varaha Swamy), the boar-avatar of the god Vishnu and his consort Lakshmi as Ambujavalli Thayar. It is Classified one among the 108 Abhimana Kshethram of Vaishnavate tradition. One of the greatest Hindu scholars of Vaishnava Tattvavada (Dvaita) philosophy, Madhvacharya, have come and resided in this temple many times.

The temple was built by the Thanjavur Nayak king Achuthappa Nayak, a vassal of the Vijayanagara Empire. A granite wall surrounds the temple, enclosing all the shrines and the temple tanks. There is a seven-tiered rajagopuram, the temple's gateway tower. This is one of important temples of Madhva section. Jagadguru Madhvacharya visited this temple many times. He took even Chaturmasya deeksha here during this time he created Dhanda Teertha with his stick to quelch the thirst of a pregnant woman. Other prominent saints of Madhva Sampradaya such as Vyasatirtha, Vadiraja Tirtha, Raghuttama Tirtha, Raghavendra Tirtha etc., have visited and stayed here for long time.

== Legend ==
The temple is associated with Varaha, the boar avatar of Vishnu. The asura king Hiranyaksha stole the earth and took it to his realm of the netherworld. The earth-goddess Bhudevi prayed to Vishnu to rescue her. Pleased, Vishnu appeared here in the form of Varaha, a boar, killed the asura. The sweat of Sri Bhuvaraha Swamy dropped here, creating the temple tank (Nithya Pushkarani). In his dying wish, the asura king asked Vishnu to turn towards his direction; Vishnu obliged. The central icon faces towards the asura in the south, while his human body faces the devotees in the West. The festival icon, Yagya Varahaswamy, as requested by Bhudevi displays the regular features of Vishnu with his conch and chakra in his hands. As per another legend, a local Nawab on the county was ailing with Carbuncle and was given up by all the doctors. He is believed to have prayed Bhuvaraha and was cured off all his ailments. He made generous contributions to the temple and was later named Bhura Sahib. Each year the deity is taken to the village when his descendants make offerings to the deity.

A unique tradition of the temple involves Hazrath Syed Sha Rahmathulla Shuttari, a revered Sufi saint who settled in Killai. He was granted 400 acres of land by Nawab Mohammad Ali Walajah. The Dargah trustee later sought assistance from a local tahsildar, Uppu Venkatarao, to demarcate the land, and in gratitude, 26 acres were permanently leased to the Sri Bhoo Varaha Swamy Temple Trust. This gesture of goodwill laid the foundation for a tradition of mutual respect. During the Masi Maham festival, the temple procession halts at the Dargah, where both communities exchange offerings—Tulsi leaves and a silk shawl from the temple, and rice, dry fruits, and prayers from the Dargah. This longstanding practice is a testament to the enduring harmony between Hindus and Muslims in the region.

== History ==
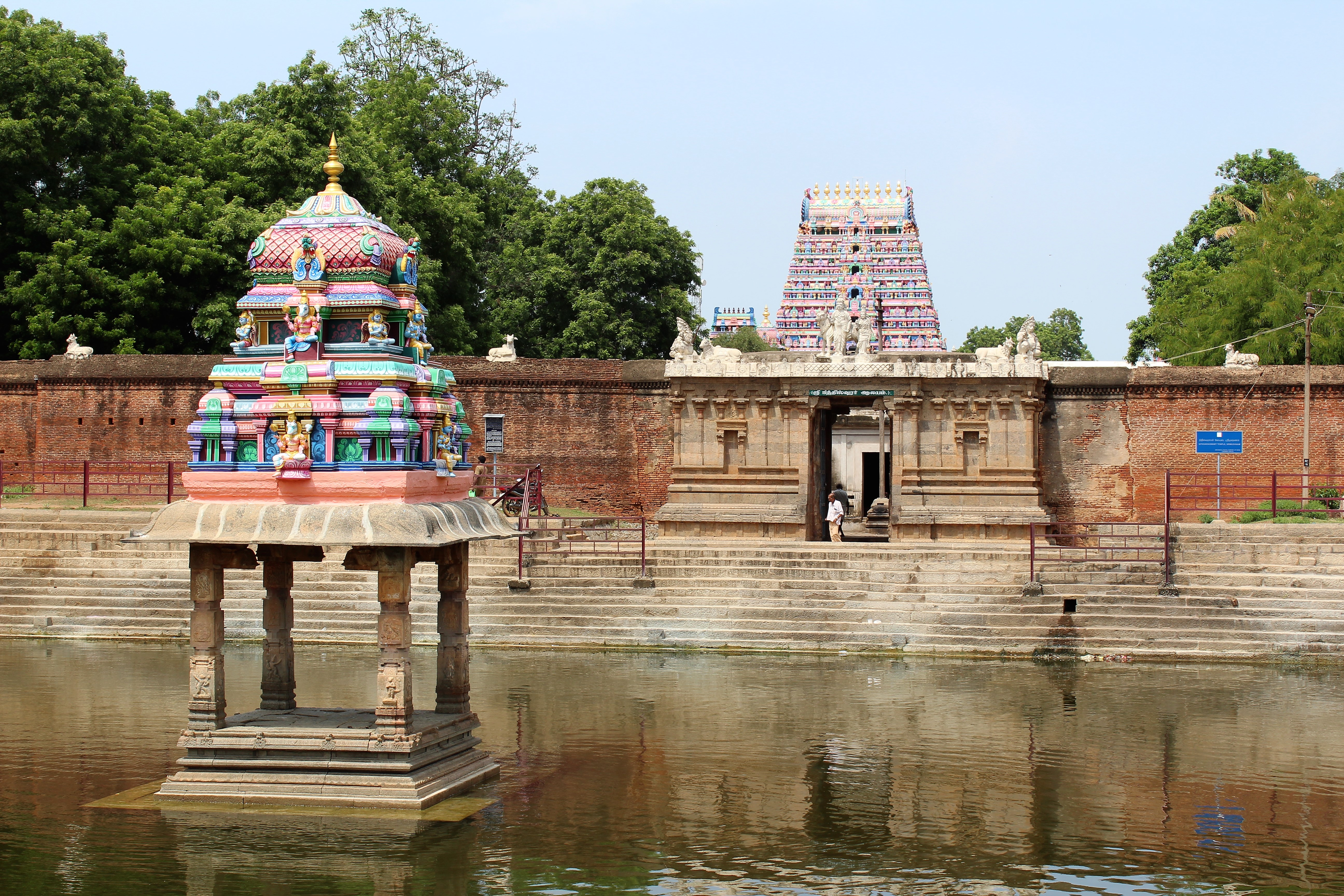
Temple tank

The existence of Bhuvaraha Swamy temple by medieval Cholas and other existing constructions and the rajagopura was done by the Vijayanagara Empire. The temple was expanded by Thanjavur Nayak king Achuthappa Nayak (1560–1614 CE). The life size image of the king and his brothers are found in the sixteen pillared hall of the temple. An epigraph dated 1068 in the nearby Shiva temples indicates gifts by Virarajendra Chola (1063–1070 CE) to the Varaha shrine. Another inscription dated at 1100 by Kulothunga Chola I (1070–1120 CE) indicates a gift of a village to the temple, where the presiding deity is referred as Varaha Alvar. The later inscriptions are from Vijayanagara kings of the 14th century like Virupaksha Raya II (1465–1485 CE) dated 1471 CE, Sriranga I (1572–1586 CE), Venkata II (1586–1614 CE) indicating various gifts to the temple. The most notable contributions of the temple were from Achuthappa Nayak who built the sixteen pillared Purushasuktha Mandapa along with other smaller shrines of the temple. The Zamindars of Udayarpalayam have contributed to the temple by offering costly jewels and commissioned additional structures, notably Udayavar Mandapam.

== Architecture ==
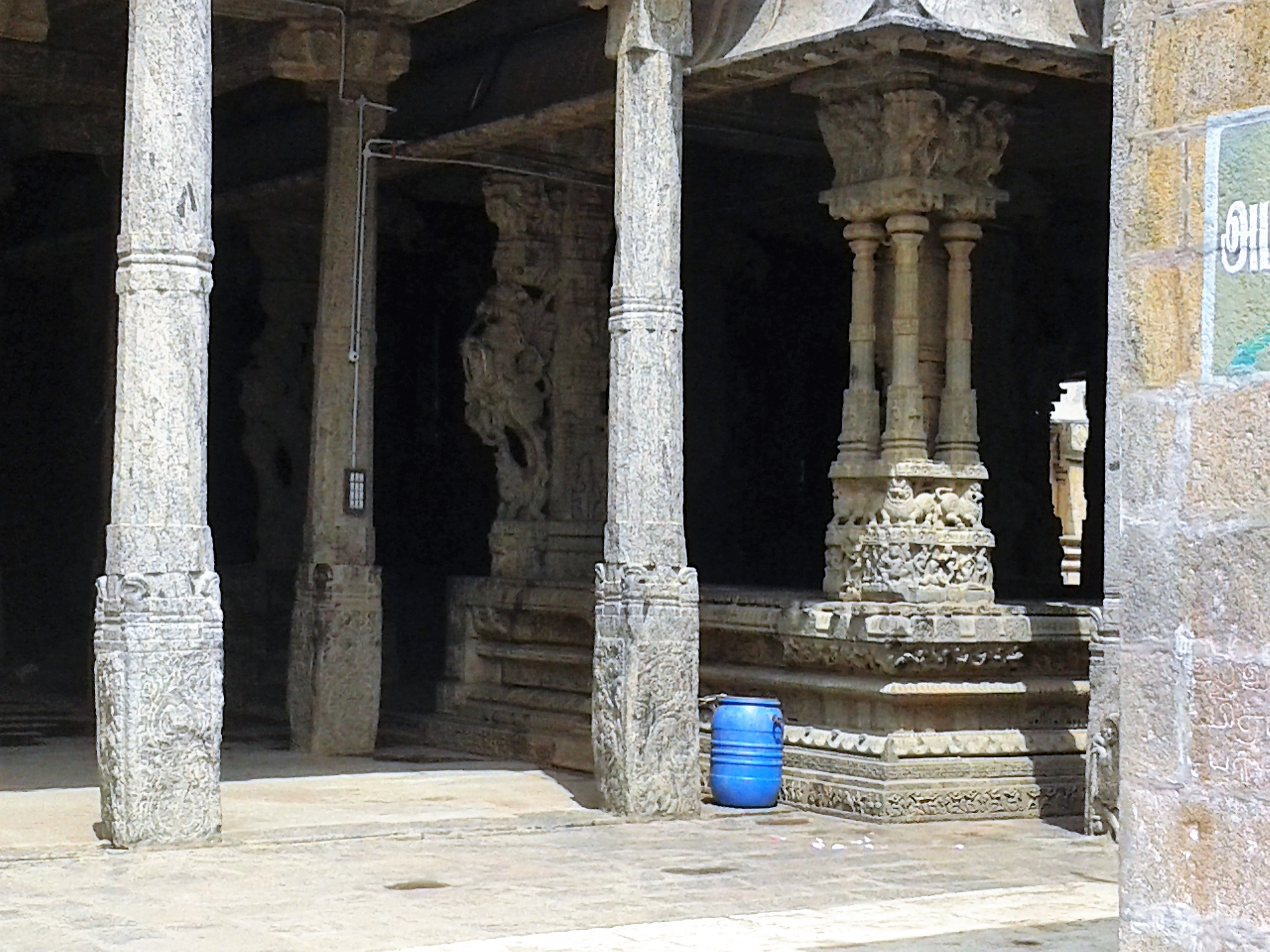
Scroll work in the temple

There are two gopurams (temple-towers at the entrance) in the temple and two precincts enclosed within large granite walls; the western tower is seven-tiered and is the commonly used entrance. The five-tiered one on the eastern side is opened only during Vaikuntha Ekadashi. There is a small image of Srinavasa Perumal (Vishnu) on the upper portion of the inner side of the tower. Outside the temple, there is an 80 ft (24 m) tall monolith pillar with the image of Garuda on its top facing the presiding deity of the temple. The sthala vriksha of the temple is an ashvatha tree.

The central shrine houses the presiding deity Varaha (Bhu Varahaswamy). The 2 ft (0.61 m)-shaligrama stone image depicts the boar-faced Varaha standing in a victorious posture with his hands on his waist; the human body faces West, while the head is turned towards the South. The utsavar (festival icon), Patharaavi, is made of panchaloha (a five-metal alloy) and is accompanied by two consorts as in most Vaishnava temples. The festival icon is housed in the Artha Mandapa, the hall before the sanctum. The temple has two dvarapala (guarding deities) on both sides of the entrance of the central shrine made of panchaloha, one of which is commissioned during the modern times. The older one on the left side was confiscated during the Mysore war and was having a wooden replica till it was replaced in 2004.

The sixteen pillared hall is called Purushasuktha Mandapa and it is the place where the hymns of Purusha sukta are recited each day during sacred ablution of the presiding deity. The vimana over the sanctum is called Pavana Vimana and is surmounted by a gold-plated kalasha. The 16 columned pavilion is considered a masterpiece of Nayak art built by Achutappa Nayak. The columns are sculpted with images of musicians, dancers and miniature idols. The ceiling has lotus medallion sculptures and scroll work. The central shrine is topped by a conical roof. The decorated outer walls are atypical of Chola Art. There is a shrine of Garuda and Nammalvar facing the sanctum away from the sixteen pillared hall. There is a separate shrine for Ambujavalli Thayar, the consort of Bhu Varaha Swamy in the second precinct which also houses the shrines of Andal and Ramanuja. Udayarpalaya Mandapam, as indicated by its name was built during the period of zamindars and it houses the Kannadi Arai (room of glasses). There are other shrines for Venugopala, Vishvaksena, Vedanta Desika, Thirumangai Alvar, Manavala Mamunigal, Kulanthai Amman and Tirukachi Nambi. There is a garden on the northern side of the temple that houses a shrine of Rama. In this temple there is a statue of Hanuman lifting Rama and Lakshmana on his shoulders.

The temple bears the inscriptions in Telugu, one of which says the grants made by Sri Ranga Raya Deva of Vijayanagara.

== Festivals and religious practices ==
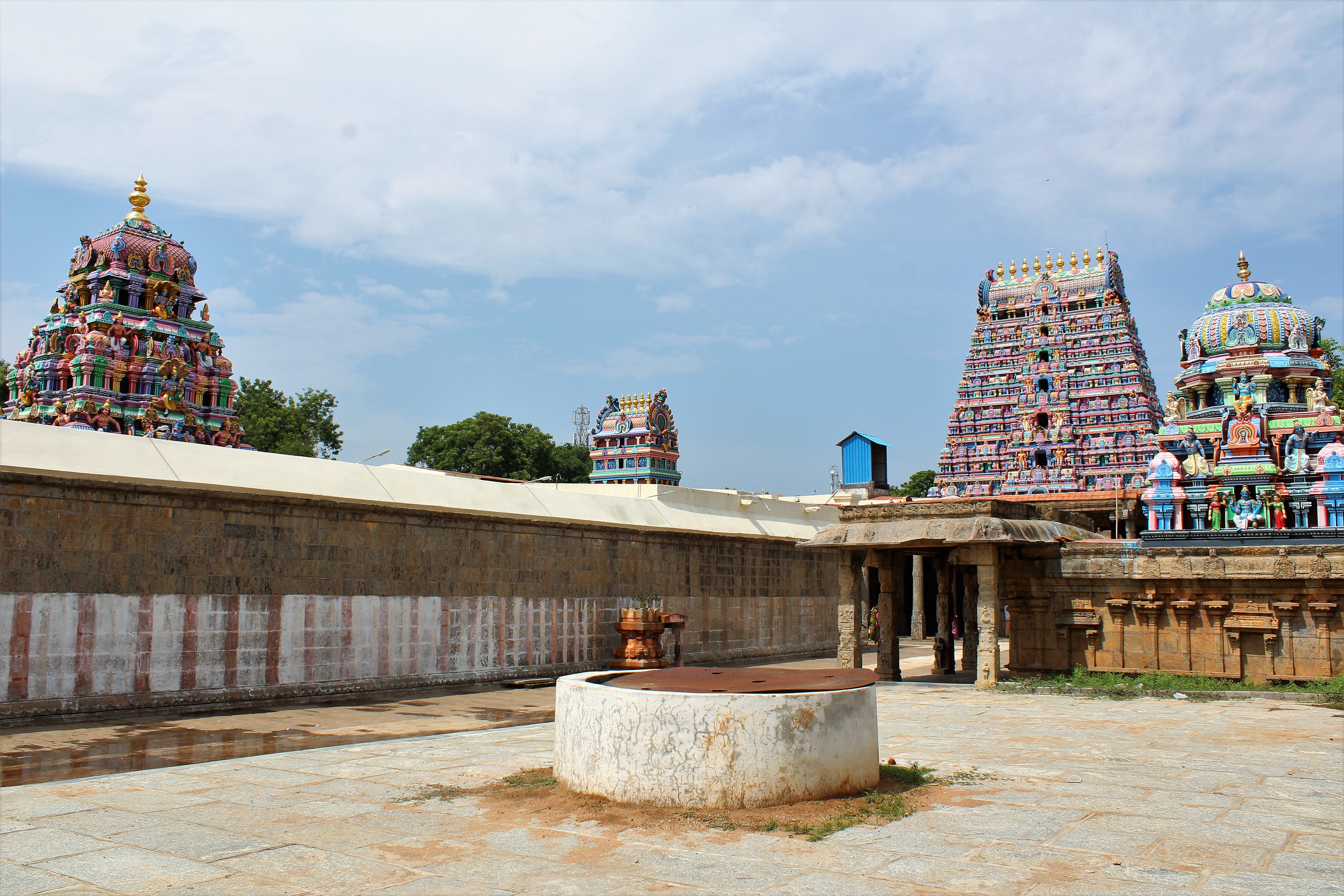
Temple well and major shrines

Some of the festivals of the temple has been practiced during the Nayak times as indicated by the inscriptions on the walls of the first precinct. The inscriptions indicate patronage for the festivals to be conducted during the presence of Sun in 12 zodiac signs during various months of the year. The usage of processional vehicles during this occasion is also prescribed. The temple follows Pancharatra mode of worship. There are two Brahmotsavams celebrated in the temple, one each during the Tamil month of Masi and other during the month of Chittirai (April–May). During the first, the festival deity of Bhu Varaha Swamy is taken for seven days around the villages of Srimushnam. The chariot festival is a symbol of Hindu–Muslim unity in the region, with the flag of the temple chariot offered by the local Muslims. They also accept the offerings from the festival deity and present it to God in the mosques. The Muslim devotees thank God for bringing Bhu Varaha Swamy to their place. The other festivals are Sri Jayanti Utsavam during Aavani, Navaratri, Vijayadashami, Deepavali and Makara Sankranti. The temple is one of the few temples where Muslims are allowed to worship till the Ardha Mandapam.

== Religious importance ==
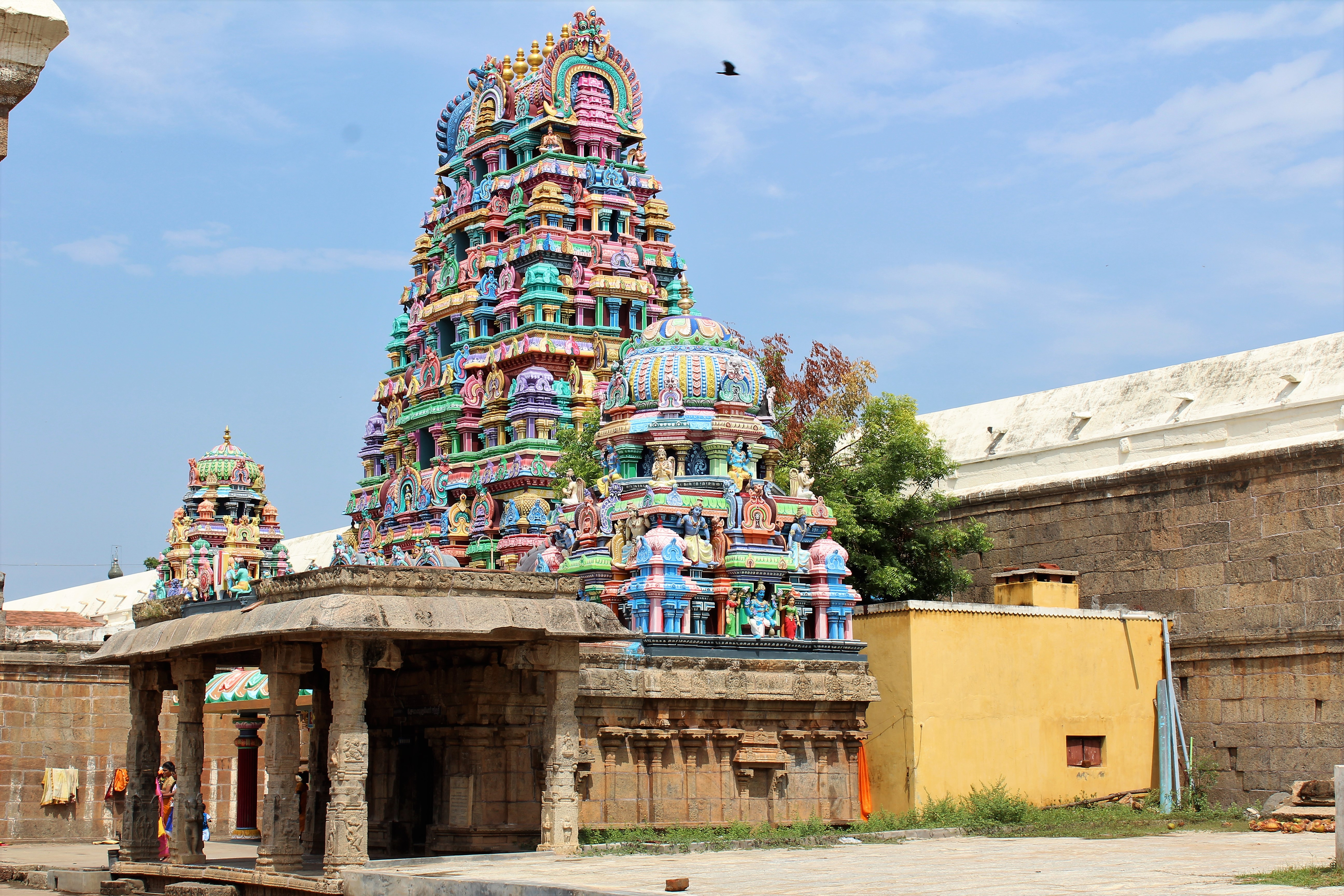
Image of Paramapada Vasal

The temple is considered one of the eight Sywayambu Kshetras of Vishnu where presiding deity is believed to have manifested on its own. Seven other temples in the line are Srirangam Ranganathaswamy temple, Tirumala Venkateswara Temple, and Vanamamalai Perumal Temple in South India and Saligrama, Naimisaranya, Pushkar and Badrinath Temple in North India. Divine ablution is performed daily for the presiding deity, unlike other Vishnu temples where it is performed only occasionally. In Tirumala, devotees are supposed to visit the Bhu Varaha temple before they worship Lord Venkateshvara but in Srimushnam devotees visit the Srinivas temple in the western entrance before visiting Bhu Varaha Swamy. The temple is frequented by childless couple seeking children and unmarried people seeking marriage. The local belief is that the worship done to Saptha Kannigaigal in the temple leads to right match.

== Sources ==
- Ayyar, P. V. Jagadisa (1982). South Indian shrines: illustrated. New Delhi: Asian Educational Services. ISBN 8120601513.
- Michell, George (2013). Southern India: A Guide to Monuments Sites & Museums. Roli Books Private Limited. ISBN 9788174369031.
- Madhavan, Chithra (2007). Vishnu Temples of South India Volume 1 (Tamil Nadu). Chithra Madhavan. ISBN 978-81-908445-0-5.
