= Manjuguni =

Village in Karnataka, India

Coordinates: 14°34′16″N 74°40′05″E

Manjuguni is a village near Sirsi town in Uttara Kannada district of Karnataka state, India. It is known for the Venkataramana Temple and is considered as the Tirupati of Karnataka. This temple has received donations from the kings of Vijayanagara Kingdom. The Venkataramana temple at Manjuguni has been mentioned in Tirtha Prabandha written by sixteenth century Madhva tradition saint Shri Vadiraja Tirtha.
