= Shri Naimishnath Vishnu Temple =

Hindu temple

Naimisharanyam
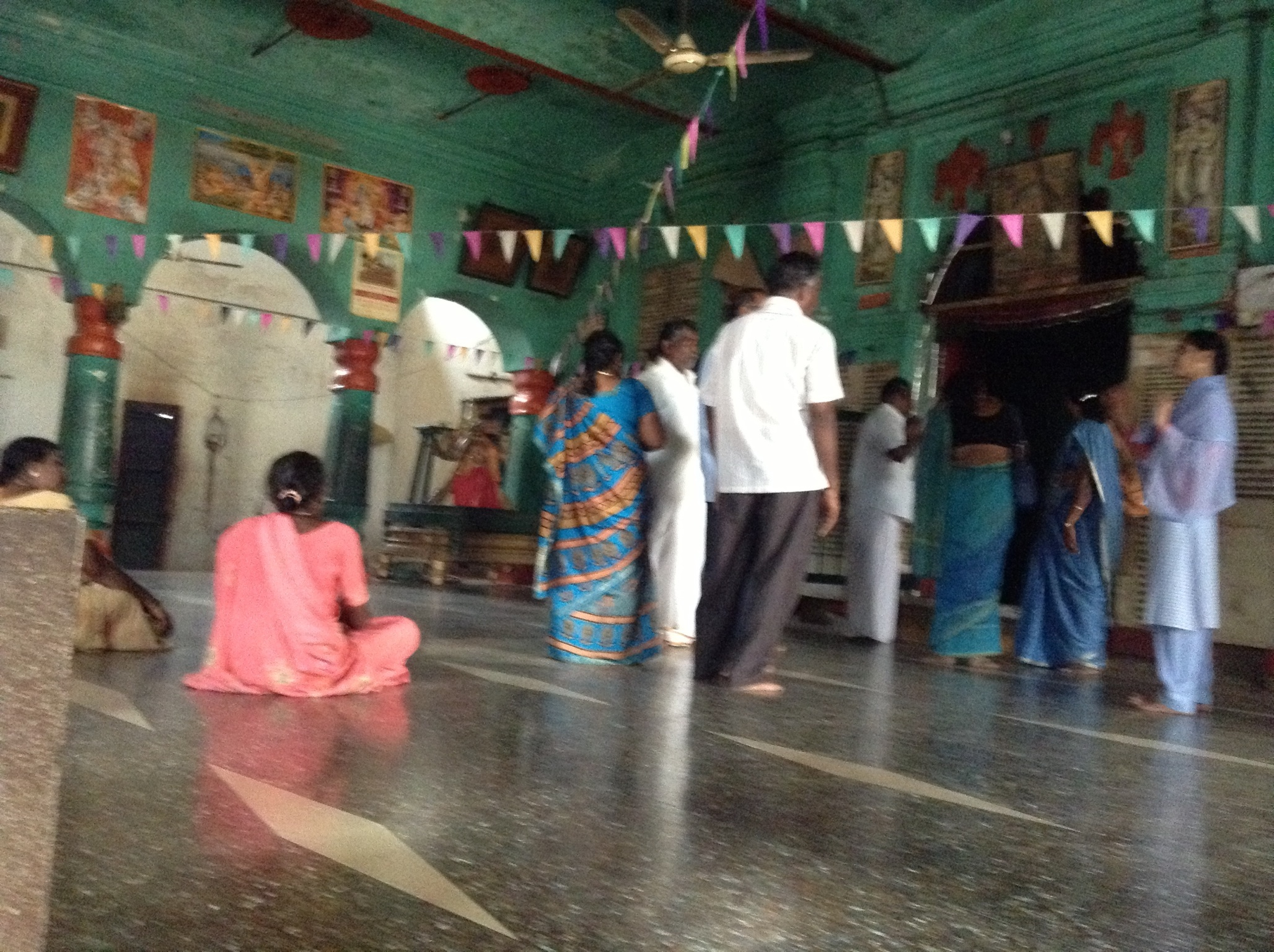

- Location in Uttar Pradesh

Religion
- Affiliation: Hinduism
- District: Sitapur
- Deity: Naimishnath or Devaraja Perumal (Vishnu), along with his consort Pundarika Valli Thayar or Naimish-Lakshmi (Mahalakshmi)
- Festival: Purnima
- Features: Temple tank: Chakra kund (Chakra Teertha temple) and Gomati river

Location
- Location: Naimisharanya
- State: Uttar Pradesh
- Country: India
- Coordinates: 27°20′54.90″N 80°29′11.21″E

Architecture
- Type: Dravida and Nagara

Shri Naimishnath Vishnu Temple, also known as the Naimishnath Devaraja temple or Naimishnarayan Temple or Ramanuj Kot Temple is a Hindu temple to Vishnu and Lakshmi in Uttar Pradesh in Naimisharanya town, Sitapur district. It is one of the Divya Desams, the 108 temples of Vishnu mentioned by Thirumangai Alvar in Nalayira Divya Prabandham. Technically, the whole city is considered a Divya Desam, not just the temple.

The temple is counted as one of the eight temples of Vishnu that self-manifested and is classified as Swayamvyaktha Kshetra.

== Legend ==
Indra, the king of the devas, was once driven out of Devaloka by an asura named Vritra. Vritra was granted the boon that he could not be killed by any weapon that was known till the time of the boon; additionally that no weapon made of wood or metal could harm him. On the advice of the god Brahma, Indra performed penance to the god Vishnu at the Naimish forest for 2000 years. Pleased, Vishnu appeared before Indra and revealed that only the weapon made from the bones of the sage Dadhichi would defeat Vritra. Indra requested the sage for his bones; the sage acceded the request and sacrificed his life. Indra created the vajra (thunderbolt) from the sage's spine and slew Vritra.

== Location ==
Naimisaranya is at the junction of the roads from Sitapur and Khairabad, 32 km from Sitapur and 42 km from the Sandila railway station, 45 miles north of Lucknow in Uttar Pradesh. Naimisaranya is also known as Nimsar or Nimkhar and is on the left bank of the river Gomati.

== Religious significance ==
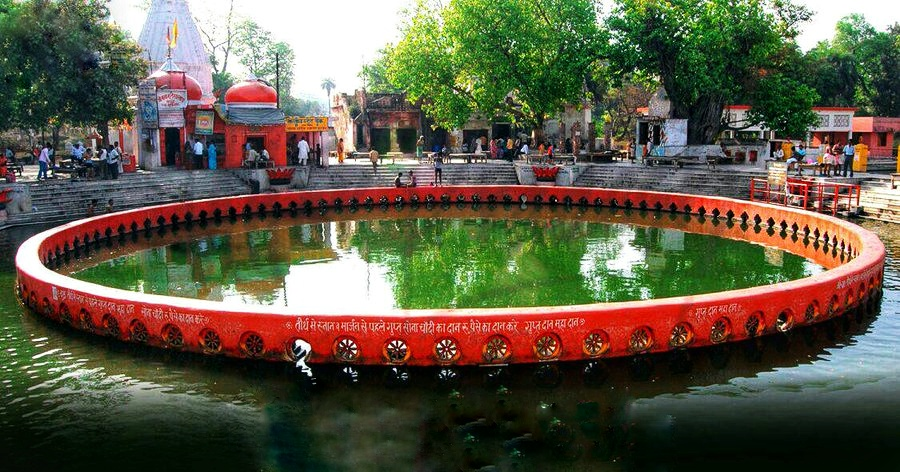
Chakra Kund (chakra teerth) is located at a distance of 600 meters from Vishnu Temple.

This place has also been visited by Shankaracharya and the famous poet, Surdas resided here. Maharishi Suta, the author of 18 puranas is believed to have lived here and presented his sayings to the sages. The forest is considered to be under the divine guardianship of Vishnu, and therefore, the puja (ritual worship) offered to him is regarded as an act of reverence toward the sacred grove itself.

The temple is counted as one of the eight temples of Vishnu that self-manifested and is classified as Swayamvyakta Kshetra. (Seven other temples in the line are Srirangam Ranganathaswamy temple, Bhu Varaha Swamy temple, Tirumala Venkateshvara Temple, and Vanamamalai Perumal Temple in South India and Saligrama (Muktinath Temple), Pushkar(Varah temple) and Badrinath Temple in North India).

Every new moon day, a large number of people purify themselves with a dip in the holy well. If the new moon falls on a Monday, it is believed that a holy bath in the well and offering to the nearby deity Lalita will wash away all the sins committed in their lifetime.

== See also ==
- Naimiṣāraṇya
- Divya Desam
- Misrikh Neemsar
