= Saraswathi Vishveshwara =

Indian scientist

- Citizenship: India
- Education: Bangalore University; City University of New York
- Alma mater: Bangalore University
- Spouse: C. V. Vishveshwara
- Children: 2 daughters
- Scientific career
- Fields: Molecular Biophysics
- Institutions: Carnegie Mellon University; Indian Institute of Science

Saraswathi Vishveshwara (born 1946) is an Indian biophysicist with specialization in the area of Molecular Biophysics. She is a professor in the Molecular Biophysics Unit at the Indian Institute of Science, Bangalore. She works on computational biology and her research is primarily focused on elucidating structure-function relationships in biological systems. Using computational-mathematical techniques to understand the functioning of macromolecules such as proteins is a key aspect of her research.

== Education ==
Saraswathi's undergraduate (B.Sc.) and post-graduate (M.Sc.) education was in Bangalore University. After she did her M.Sc. in bio-chemistry, she completed her Ph.D. at the City University of New York under the guidance of David Beveridge of Hunter College. Her doctorate was in quantum chemistry.

== Professional experience ==
After her doctorate Vishveshwara became a postdoctoral fellow at the Carnegie Mellon University, Pittsburgh. She worked with well-known quantum chemist and Nobel Laureate, John Pople. She returned to India and joined the Indian Institute of Science as a postdoctoral fellow in the Molecular Biophysics Unit. She became a faculty member and Professor.

== Personal life ==
Saraswathi's husband, physicist, Dr. C.V. Vishveshwara, known as the Black Hole Man of India, died in 2017. Saraswathi spoke at the inaugural C. V. Vishveshwara Public Lecture series. Their daughter is physicist Smitha Vishveshwara.
