= Yellur, Udupi =

Yellur
- village
- Location in Karnataka, India Yellur (India)
- Coordinates: 13.187520°N 74.80086°E
- Country: India
- State: Karnataka

Government
  - Body: Gram panchayat

Languages
  - Official: Tulu
- Time zone: UTC+5:30 (IST)
- ISO 3166 code: IN-KA
- Vehicle registration: KA
- Website: karnataka.gov.in

Yellur is a village in Udupi District in the state of Karnataka in India.

Yellur and its surrounding places were acquired to set up a coal-based thermal power station, the Udupi Power Plant.

Set in Kudremukh National Park, Yellur contains lush green vegetation, forests, and fertile crop fields. The village houses Mahathobhara Shri Vishveshara Temple which is said to be there from eleventh century.
