= Tiruppullani block =

Tiruppullani block is a revenue block in the Ramanathapuram district of Tamil Nadu, India. It has a total of 33 panchayat villages.
