= C. V. Vishveshwara =

Indian physicist (1938–2017)

C.V.Vishveshwara
- Born: 6 March 1938
- Died: 16 January 2017 (aged 78)
- Education: University of Maryland
- Known for: Stability of Schwarzschild Blackhole; Quasinormal Modes
- Spouse: Saraswathi Vishveshwara
- Scientific career
- Fields: General relativity
- Workplaces: Raman Research Institute; Indian Institute of Astrophysics
- Doctoral advisor: Charles W. Misner

C.V. Vishveshwara (6 March 1938 – 16 January 2017), commonly known as Vishu, was an Indian scientist and black hole physicist. Specializing in Einstein's General Relativity, he worked extensively on the theory of black holes and made major contributions to this field of research since its very beginning. He is popularly known as the 'black hole man of India'.

== Biography ==
=== Academic training and university positions ===
With initial interest in particle physics Vishveshwara joined Columbia University, where Robert W. Fuller was his mentor. Later he developed interest in General Relativity and encouraged by Fuller, transferred to University of Maryland to work with Charles W. Misner. He received his AM degree from Columbia University. Working on the Stability of the Schwarzschild Black Hole under Misner, he obtained his PhD from the University of Maryland. After a postdoctoral appointment at the Goddard Institute for Space Studies, he served on the faculties of New York University, and University of Pittsburgh. After his return to his hometown, Channapatna, famous for wooden toys, of Bengaluru, India, he was a senior professor at the Raman Research Institute and the Indian Institute of Astrophysics. Vishveshwara has also held the position of Visiting Professor at several universities including University of Pennsylvania, University of Maryland, Boston University, University of London, and Universidad del Pais Vasco.

=== Research ===
Vishveshwara was one of the first to analyze the structure of black holes employing spacetime symmetries thereby demonstrating the existence of the ergosphere. He proved the stability of the non-rotating Schwarzschild black hole, a crucial factor that ensures its continued existence after formation. Further, he discovered the quasinormal modes of black holes. These modes of black hole vibrations are one of the main targets of observation using the gravitational wave detectors. In later years, he investigated black holes in cosmological backgrounds, an important aspect of black hole physics that had hardly been explored. Vishveshwara has also made significant contributions to other areas of general relativity such as the exact solutions of Einstein's field equations, gravitational collapse, compact stellar objects, inertial forces, and spacetime perturbations.

== Books and other publications ==
In addition to authoring a number of technical papers, Vishveshwara has co-edited ten volumes on relativity, astrophysics and cosmology including those published by Cambridge University Press and Kluwer Academic Publishers. He has contributed articles to these volumes and illustrated two of the volumes with his cartoons. Further, he has written a number of popular articles on various topics in science.

His book "Einstein's Enigma or Black Holes in My Bubble Bath" received favorable comments from Roger Penrose, Nobel laureate Anthony James Leggett, Charles Misner, and other readers worldwide. It has also been translated into Italian.

"Black Holes, Gravitational Radiation and the Universe: Essays in Honour of C.V. Vishveshwara,- Bala R. Iyer and Biplab Bhawal(eds)", (Kluwer Academic Publishers (1999)) contains essays contributed by Roger Penrose, Jacob Bekenstein, Abhay Ashtekar, Ashoke Sen etc.

== Planetarium and promotion of science ==
As founder-director of the Planetarium in Bangalore, he has written the scripts of several planetarium programmes and directed them. These are aimed at presenting difficult concepts in a simple and attractive manner. Vishveshwara has also produced two short science films.

To promote research as a part of education he started "Research Education Advancement Program". As a part of it, undergraduate students are taught in fundamentals of Physics or Biology by practicing scientists in the field and selected students are involved in research projects at institutes like Indian Institute of Science, Raman Research Institute, Indian Institute of Astrophysics, The National Centre for Biological Sciences.

== See also ==
- Charles W. Misner
- Quasinormal modes
- Subrahmanyan Chandrasekhar
- Engelbert Schücking
- Golden age of general relativity
- Smitha Vishveshwara, Vishveshwara's daughter
