= Tirtha Prabandha =

Hindu text

The Tirtha Prabandha (Sanskrit: तीर्थप्रबन्धम्, romanized: Tīrthaprabandhaṃ) is one of the main Sanskrit works by Vadiraja Tirtha, the 16th century Dvaita philosopher and saint. The document is written in the form of a travelogue and contains descriptions of pilgrim centers throughout India.

== Description ==
The work comprises 235 shlokas and is divided into 4 chapters, one for each direction. Vadiraja Tirtha composed this document during his extensive pilgrimage throughout India. The shlokas, in addition to describing the places, also provides information on the sacredness of the places and praises the deities.

The chapter covering North India mentions important places such as Pandarapur, Prayag, Kashi, Gaya, Mathura and Ayodhya. The chapter on South India covers Rameshwaram, Kanyakumari and Trivandrum. The chapter on West India covers Pajaka, Udupi, Gokarna and Kolhapur. The chapter on the east covers Puri, Ahobila and Hampi. A total of about 100 places are covered in the document. In addition to holy places, a lot of rivers, including Ganges, Yamuna, Kaveri and Godavari are mentioned.

The Tirtha Prabandha is held in high esteem amongst practising Madhva Hindus and a recitation of all the shlokas is considered equal to an actual pilgrimage covering all the mentioned places. Some of the holy places mentioned in Tirtha Prabandha are:

West:

- Udupi
- Pajaka
- Yellur
- Saligrama
- Kukke Subramanya
- Kumbasi
- Koteshwara
- Shankarnarayana
- Kollur
- Bankapura
- Banavasi
- Manjuguni
- Yana
- Gokarna
- Kolhapur
- Veraval
- Dwarka
- Siddapuri
- Pushkar

East:

- Puri
- Tirumala
- Srisailam
- Hampi
- Anegundi
- Kanchipuram
- Kumbakonam

South:

- Rameshwaram
- Dhanushkodi
- Kanyakumari
- Suchindram
- Srirangapatna
- Kaveri
- Ananthashayana
- Thiruvattar
- Mahendra Parvata
- Thiruppulani

North :

- Pandarpur
- Prayag
- Kashi
- Gaya
- Mathura
- Vrindavana
- Ayodhya
- Hastinapur
- kurukshetra
- Shambala
- Badrinath
- Naimiṣāraṇya (forest)

Parishista:

- Mayapuri
- Avanti

== See also ==
- Works of Madhvacharya
- Rukminisha Vijaya
