= Smitha Vishveshwara =

American physicist

Smitha Vishveshwara (born 1974) is an Indian-American theoretical quantum condensed matter physicist whose research includes work on cold Bose gases and non-equilibrium quantum dynamics, as well as strongly correlated materials, dimensional confinement, fractionalization of quasiparticles, quantum quench dynamics, connections from condensed matter physics to protein structure networks, and quantum analogues of black hole collision ringdown. She is a professor of physics at the University of Illinois Urbana-Champaign.

== Education and career ==
Vishveshwara is one of two daughters of two Indian physicists, black hole physicist C. V. Vishveshwara and biophysicist Saraswathi Vishveshwara. She was born in 1974 in the US, in Pittsburgh, but her parents brought her back to India as an infant. After education in India in the school of philosopher Jiddu Krishnamurti, she returned to the US for her higher education, and majored in physics as an undergraduate at Cornell University, with Carl Franck and N. David Mermin as faculty mentors, graduating magna cum laude in 1996. Next, she went to the University of California, Santa Barbara for graduate study with Matthew P. A. Fisher, completing her Ph.D. in 2002. Her dissertation was A Three-Act Play of Strongly Correlated Electrons.

After completing her doctorate, she became a postdoctoral researcher at the University of Illinois Urbana-Champaign, working with Paul Goldbart and Tony Leggett. In 2005, she obtained a tenure-track faculty position, allowing her to remain at the University of Illinois. As well as her primary appointment in the physics department, she also holds affiliations with the Illinois Materials Research Laboratory and Beckman Institute for Advanced Science and Technology.

== Recognition ==
Vishveshwara was named a Fellow of the American Physical Society (APS) in 2019, after a nomination from the APS Division of Condensed Matter Physics, "for pioneering theory of quantum dynamics in nonequilibrium systems and novel phenomena in cold Bose gases".
