= List of Kannada songs recorded by S. P. Balasubrahmanyam =

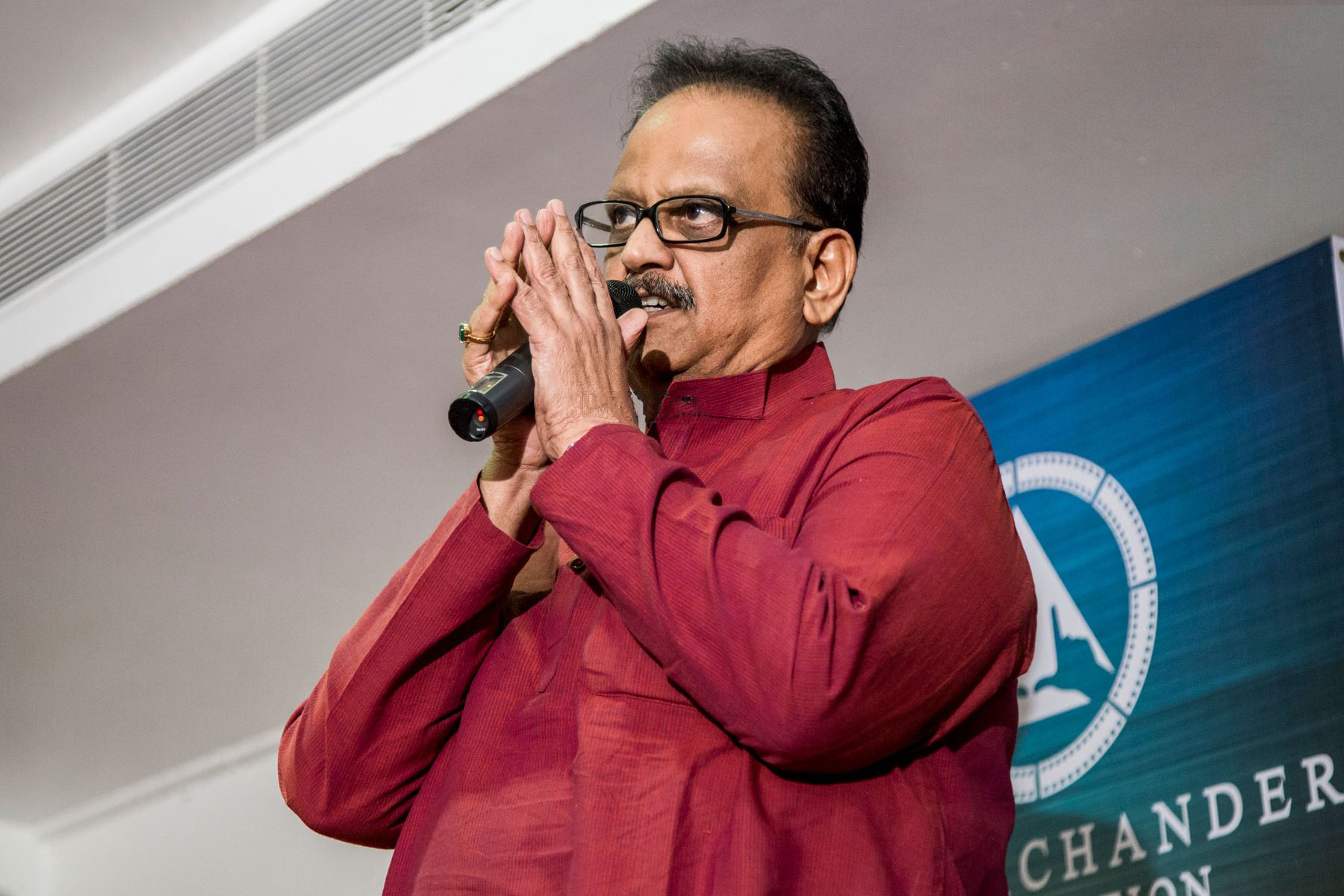
SPB in 2016

S. P. Balasubrahmanyam was an Indian playback singer, actor, music director, voice actor and film producer. He is mostly referred to as S. P. B. or Balu. He has won the Guinness World Record for recording the highest number of songs. The following is a list of the songs he sung in Kannada:

== Film songs ==
=== 1967 ===
| Film | Song | Composer(s) | Writer(s) | Co-singer(s) |
|---|---|---|---|---|
| Nakkare Ade Swarga | "Kanasido Nanasido" | M. Ranga Rao | Vijaya Naarasimha | P. Susheela |

=== 1969 ===
| Film | Song | Composer(s) | Writer(s) | Co-singer(s) |
|---|---|---|---|---|
| Choori Chikkanna | "Nee Modalu Modalu" | Satyam | Chi. Udayashankar | Bangalore Latha |
| Kadina Rahasya | "Oh Baaluki Kulukuva Gombe" | C. Satyam | Geethapriya | Jayadeva |
| Maduve Maduve Maduve | "Jodi Jade Jamuna" | C. Satyam | Geethapriya | Sumithra |

=== 1970 ===
| Film | Song | Composer(s) | Writer(s) |
|---|---|---|---|
| Mr. Rajkumar | "I Love You" | S. Rajeshwara Rao | Chi. Udayashankar |
| Mr. Rajkumar | "Unte Unte Ammayya" | S. Rajeshwara Rao | Chi. Udayashankar |
| Mr. Rajkumar | "Ba Ba Ba Bangalore" | S. Rajeshwara Rao | Chi. Udayashankar |
| Seetha | "Shubhashaya Maduveya Ee Bandha" | Vijaya Bhaskar | R. N. Jayagopal |
| Boregowda Bangalorige Banda | "Alli Illi Hudukutha Kannu" | Rajan–Nagendra | P. Susheela |
| Boregowda Bangalorige Banda | "Naamadhe Naaadellaa" | Rajan–Nagendra | |
| Rangamahal Rahasya | "Kalli Haage Nota" | Satyam | |

=== 1971 ===
| Film | Song | Composer(s) | Lyrics(s) | Co-singer(s) |
|---|---|---|---|---|
| Namma Samsara | "Namma Samsara Aananda Sagara" | M. Ranga Rao | | P. B. Srinivas, P. Susheela |
| Nyayave Devaru | "Paramathma Adisidanthe Aaduve" | Rajan-Nagendra | Chi. Udayashankar | |

=== 1972 ===
| Film | Song | Composer(s) | Writer(s) | Co-singer(s) |
|---|---|---|---|---|
| Bangaarada Manushya | "Hani Hani Goodidre" | G. K. Venkatesh | Vijaya Narasimha | P. B. Sreenivas, P. Susheela |
| Kranti Veera | "Molagali Molagali" | C. Satyam | Chi. Udaya Shankar | Mahadevan, B. Vasantha |
| Naagarahaavu | "Haavina Dwesha" | Vijaya Bhaskar | | |
| Nari Munidare Mari | "Nammornage" | Rajan–Nagendra | Geethapriya | Saroja, Sadan |
| Nari Munidare Mari | "Nammurnaag Naaanobne Jaana" | Rajan–Nagendra | Geethapriya | L. R. Eswari |
| Sipayi Ramu | "Kokorekoko Kokorekoko Ko" | Upendra Kumar | | L. R. Eswari |
| Kulla Agent 000 | "Ella Mayavo Prabhuve" | Rajan–Nagendra | | |
| Kulla Agent 000 | "Singapoorininda Bande" | Rajan–Nagendra | | L. R. Eswari |
| Kulla Agent 000 | "Kulla Agent 000" | Rajan–Nagendra | | |
| Nanda Gokula | "Nanjana Goodina" | Vijaya Bhaskar | | P. B. Sreenivas |

=== 1973 ===
| Film | Song | Composer(s) | Writer(s) | Co-singer(s) |
|---|---|---|---|---|
| Edakallu Guddada Mele | "Santosha Sangeetha", "Gundina Matthe Gammathu" | M. Ranga Rao | | P. Susheela |

=== 1974 ===
| Film | Song | Composer(s) | Writer(s) | Co-singer(s) |
|---|---|---|---|---|
| Professor Huchuraya | Hare Rama Hare Krishna | Rajan–Nagendra | Ku. Ra. See | L. R. Eswari |
| Professor Huchuraya | Koodi Bandide Kankana | Rajan–Nagendra | Nagendra Babu | P. Leela |
| Bhakta Kumbara | Vitala Vitala Panduranga Vitala | G. K. Venkatesh | | |

=== 1975 ===
| Film | Song | Composer(s) | Writer(s) | Co-singer(s) |
|---|---|---|---|---|
| Devara Gudi | "Maamaravello" | Rajan–Nagendra | Chi. Udayashankar | |
| Devara Gudi | "Kannu Kannu" | Rajan–Nagendra | Chi. Udayashankar | S. Janaki |
| Devara Gudi | "Cheluveya Andada" | Rajan–Nagendra | Chi. Udayashankar | |
| Devara Kannu | "Ninna Neenu Maretharenu" (male) | T. G. Lingappa | Chi. Udaya Shankar | solo |
| Kalla Kulla | "Naa Haadalu" | Rajan–Nagendra | Chi. Udaya Shankar | solo |
| Shubhamangala | "Snehada Kadalalli" | Vijaya Bhaskar | Chi. Udayashankar | |
| Shubhamangala | "Hema Naakondla Naaku" | Vijaya Bhaskar | M. N. Vyasa Rao | |

=== 1976 ===
| Film | Song | Composer(s) | Writer(s) | Co-singer(s) |
|---|---|---|---|---|
| Baalu Jenu | "Samsaarada Santoshave" | G. K. Venkatesh | R. N. Jayagopal | |
| Bangarada Gudi | "Baruthiruva Baruthiruva" | G. K. Venkatesh | Chi. Udaya Shankar | solo |
| Bangarada Gudi | "Ninadene Irali" | G. K. Venkatesh | Chi. Udaya Shankar | P. Susheela |
| Bangarada Gudi | "Thayya Thakka" | G. K. Venkatesh | Chi. Udaya Shankar | S. Janaki |
| Bangarada Gudi | "Arerare Arerare" | G. K. Venkatesh | Chi. Udaya Shankar | Vani Jairam |
| Bayalu Daari | "Kanasalu Neene, Manasalu Neene" | Rajan–Nagendra | Chi. Udaya Shankar | Vani Jairam |
| Bayalu Daari | "Elliruve Manava Kaaduva" | Rajan–Nagendra | Chi. Udaya Shankar | solo |
| Besuge | "Yava Hoovu Yara Mudigo" | Vijaya Bhaskar | Shyamsundar Kulkarni | |
| Besuge | "Besuge Besuge " | Vijaya Bhaskar | Geethapriya | Vani Jairam |
| Besuge | "Vasantha Baredanu" | Vijaya Bhaskar | Vijaya Naarasimha | Vani Jairam |
| Maangalya Bhagya | "Aaseya Bhava" | Rajan–Nagendra | Vijaya Naarasimha | |
| Maangalya Bhagya | "Soundarya Thumbide " | Rajan–Nagendra | R.N. Jayagopal | S. Janaki |
| Maangalya Bhagya | "Kelu Maguve Katheya" | Rajan–Nagendra | Vijaya Naarasimha | |
| Makkala Bhagya | "O Gelati Nannane" | Vijaya Bhaskar | N/A | S. P. Balasubrahmanyam |
| Mugiyada Kathe | "Kangalu Vandane Helide" | Rajan-Nagendra | Chi. Udayashankar | S. Janaki |
| Mugiyada Kathe | "Muthu Uruli Hogi" | Rajan-Nagendra | Chi. Udayashankar | solo |
| Phalitamsha | "Pyateyinda Bandavane" | Vijaya Bhaskar | | Vani Jairam |
| Phalitamsha | "Love Endarenu" | Vijaya Bhaskar | | solo |
| Phalitamsha | "Ee Chendina Aata" | Vijaya Bhaskar | | P. Susheela |

=== 1977 ===
| Film | Song | Composer(s) | Writer(s) | Co-singer(s) |
|---|---|---|---|---|
| Bayalu Daari | "Kanasalu Neene Manasalu Neene" | Rajan–Nagendra | | Vani Jairam |
| Bayalu Daari | "Elliruve Manava Kaduva" | Rajan–Nagendra | | |
| Kokila | "Gum Gum Endu Dumbigalu Haradi" | Salil Chowdhury | Chi. Udaya Shankar | Vani Jairam |
| Kumkuma Rakshe | "Neenu Balle Naanu Balle | Vijaya Bhaskar | | solo |
| Kumkuma Rakshe | "Taanonda Nenedare Maanava" | Vijaya Bhaskar | | solo |
| Maagiya Kanasu | "Ellellu Neene" | Vijaya Bhaskar | Ravi | solo |
| Pavana Ganga | "Aakasha Deepavu Neenu" | Rajan–Nagendra | | S. Janaki |
| Pavana Ganga | "Modalane Dinave" | Rajan–Nagendra | | S. Janaki |

=== 1978 ===
| Film | Song | Composer(s) | Writer(s) | Co-singer(s) |
|---|---|---|---|---|
| Aparichita | "Ee Naada Anda" | L. Vaidyanathan | P. R. Ramdas Naidu | solo |
| Vasantha Lakshmi | "Belli Modave Elli Oduve" | Vijaya Bhaskar | Chi. Udaya Shankar | Vani Jairam |
| Vasantha Lakshmi | "Nadeyale Naduvu" | Vijaya Bhaskar | R. N. Jayagopal | K. J. Yesudas, S. Janaki, Vani Jairam |
| Hombisilu | "Jeeva Veene", "Neera bittu Nelada mele" | Rajan–Nagendra | Geethapriya | S. Janaki |
| Kiladi Jodi | "Naachike Inneke" | Rajan–Nagendra | Chi. Udayashankar | S. Janaki |
| Kiladi Jodi | "Krishnaswamy Ramaswamy" | Rajan–Nagendra | Chi. Udayashankar | S. Janaki |
| Kiladi Jodi | "Kanasinali Nodidenu" | Rajan–Nagendra | Chi. Udayashankar | S. Janaki |
| Kiladi Jodi | "Kiladi Jodi" | Rajan–Nagendra | Chi. Udayashankar | K. J. Yesudas |
| Kiladi Jodi | "Aadabeku Karate Aadabeku" | Rajan–Nagendra | Doddarange Gowda | solo |
| Paduvaaralli Pandavaru | "Janma Needidha, Bhuthaayiya" | Vijaya Bhaskar | N/A | solo |
| Paduvaaralli Pandavaru | "Saavira Saavira Yuga" | Vijaya Bhaskar | N/A | solo |
| Paduvaaralli Pandavaru | "Kannmuchi Kulithare" | Vijaya Bhaskar | N/A | solo |
| Paduvaaralli Pandavaru | "Bahishkaara Bahishkaara" | Vijaya Bhaskar | N/A | solo |
| Paduvaaralli Pandavaru | "Haadomme Haadabeku" | Vijaya Bhaskar | N/A | P. B. Sreenivas |
| Paduvaaralli Pandavaru | "Esu Varsa Aayithe Ninge" | Vijaya Bhaskar | N/A | Kasturi Shankar |
| Parasangada Gendethimma | "Notadage Nageya Meeti" | Rajan–Nagendra | Doddarangegowda | |
| Parasangada Gendethimma | "Thera Eri Ambaradaage" | Rajan–Nagendra | Doddarangegowda | |
| Parasangada Gendethimma | "Notadage Nageya Meeti" (Sad) | Rajan–Nagendra | Doddarangegowda | |
| Sneha Sedu | "Saaku Saaku Mathu Saaku" | S. Rajeswara Rao | Chi. Udaya Shankar | P. Susheela |
| Sneha Sedu | "Entha Sogasu Ee Jeevana" | S. Rajeswara Rao | Chi. Udaya Shankar | P. Susheela |
| Sneha Sedu | "Badavara Maathigu" | S. Rajeswara Rao | Chi. Udaya Shankar | P. Susheela, Ramakrishna |
| Thappida Thala | "Yaathara Vichithra Baalu" | Vijaya Bhaskar | Hunsur Krishnamurthy | solo |
| Thappida Thala | "Thappida Thalagalu" | Vijaya Bhaskar | Hunsur Krishnamurthy | solo |

=== 1979 ===
| Film | Song | Composer(s) | Writer(s) | Co-singer(s) |
|---|---|---|---|---|
| Adalu Badalu | "Nalidide Jeevana Ganga" | Vijaya Bhaskar | Vijaya Narasimha | Vani Jairam |
| Adalu Badalu | "Nalidide Jeevana Ganga" | Vijaya Bhaskar | Vijaya Narasimha | solo |
| Adalu Badalu | "Prayada Vayasige" | Vijaya Bhaskar | Doddarange Gowda | S. Janaki |
| Bhoolokadalli Yamaraja | "Endu Kaanada Belaka Kande" | C. Ashwath | Doddarange Gowda | Vani Jairam |
| Bhoolokadalli Yamaraja | "Ninna Myaage" | C. Ashwath | Doddarange Gowda | S. Janaki, Vani Jairam |
| Bhoolokadalli Yamaraja | "Youvvana Mojina Aananda" | C. Ashwath | Doddarange Gowda | S. Janaki |
| Oorvasi Neene Nanna Preyasi | "Iniya Saniye" | Ilaiyaraaja | N/A | Vani Jairam |
| Oorvasi Neene Nanna Preyasi | "Masthana" | Ilaiyaraaja | N/A | Anand, S. P. Sailaja, Vani Jairam |
| Oorvasi Neene Nanna Preyasi | "Singari Bangari" | Ilaiyaraaja | N/A | solo |
| Chandanada Gombe | "Ee Binka Bidu Bidu | Rajan–Nagendra | Chi. Udaya Shankar | S. Janaki |
| Chandanada Gombe | "Maneyanu Belagide" | Rajan–Nagendra | Chi. Udaya Shankar | S. Janaki |
| Chandanada Gombe | "Aakashadinda" | Rajan–Nagendra | Chi. Udaya Shankar | solo |
| Naa Ninna Bidalaare | "Hosa Balige" | Rajan–Nagendra | Chi. Udayashankar | S. Janaki |
| Naa Ninna Bidalaare | "Naanu Neenu Ondada" | Rajan–Nagendra | Chi. Udayashankar | S. Janaki |
| Dharmasere | "Kanda Oh Nanna" | Upendra Kumar | | |
| Dharmasere | "Ee Sambhashane" | Upendra Kumar | | S. Janaki |
| Naniruvude Ninagagi | "Premada Haadige" | Rajan-Nagendra | Chi. Udayashankar | S. Janaki |
| Naniruvude Ninagagi | "Jooly Nanna Jooly" | Rajan-Nagendra | Chi. Udayashankar | S. Janaki |
| Naniruvude Ninagagi | "Kumkumaviruvude Hanegaagi" | Rajan-Nagendra | Chi. Udayashankar | |
| Naniruvude Ninagagi | "Nannallu Ninnallu" | Rajan-Nagendra | R.N. Jayagopal | S. Janaki |
| Putani Agent 123 | "Putaani Agent 123" | Rajan–Nagendra | N/A | S. Janaki, Rajeshwari |
| Putani Agent 123 | "Yeno Santhosha" | Rajan–Nagendra | N/A | S. Janaki |

=== 1980 ===
| Film | Song | Composer(s) | Writer(s) | Co-singer(s) |
|---|---|---|---|---|
| Auto Raja | "Nanna Aase Hannaagi" | Rajan-Nagendra | Chi. Udayashankar | S. Janaki |
| Auto Raja | "Naliva Gulaabi Hoove" | Rajan-Nagendra | Chi. Udayashankar | |
| Auto Raja | "Paramatma Aadisidanthe" | Rajan-Nagendra | Chi. Udayashankar | |
| Bangarada Jinke | "Olume Siriya Kandu" | Vijaya Bhaskar | Doddarange Gowda | Vani Jairam |
| Bangarada Jinke | "Olume Siriya Kandu" (male) | Vijaya Bhaskar | Doddarange Gowda | solo |
| Driver Hanumanthu | "Bhooloka Aledaru" | Vijaya Bhaskar | Doddarange Gowda | solo |
| Driver Hanumanthu | "Singari Eduru" | Vijaya Bhaskar | Doddarange Gowda | solo |
| Hanthakana Sanchu | "Aaha Ramanchana" | Vijaya Bhaskar | Vijaya Narasimha | Kasturi Shankar |
| Janma Janmada Anubandha | "Yaava Shilpi Kanda Kanasu" | Ilaiyaraaja | Chi. Udaya Shankar | S. Janaki |
| Janma Janmada Anubandha | "Aakashadinda Jaari" | Ilaiyaraaja | Chi. Udaya Shankar | S. Janaki |
| Janma Janmada Anubandha | "Gandagi Naanu" | Ilaiyaraaja | Chi. Udaya Shankar | S. P. Sailaja |
| Jari Bidda Jana | "Halliya Thotadi" | T. G. Lingappa | Chi. Udaya Shankar | Vani Jairam |
| Jari Bidda Jana | "Nanage Nanade Nyaya" | T. G. Lingappa | Chi. Udaya Shankar | solo |
| Kaalinga | "Durugutti Nodabedayya" | C. Satyam | R. N. Jayagopal | P. Susheela |
| Kaalinga | "Thata Pata Hanigalu" | C. Satyam | | P. Susheela |
| Makkala Saninya | "Mutthinantha" | M. S. Viswanathan | R. N. Jayagopal | B. S. Sasirekha |
| Makkala Saninya | "Thallu Model" | M. S. Viswanathan | R. N. Jayagopal | chorus |
| Maria My Darling | "Naanindhu" | Shankar–Ganesh | Chi. Udaya Shankar | Vani Jairam |
| Maria My Darling | "Maria My Love" (version 1) | Shankar–Ganesh | Chi. Udaya Shankar | solo |
| Maria My Darling | "Maria My Love" (version 2) | Shankar–Ganesh | Chi. Udaya Shankar | solo |
| Maria My Darling | "Maria My Love" (version 3) | Shankar–Ganesh | Chi. Udaya Shankar | solo |
| Minchina Ota | "Heege Nee Naguthiruvaaga" | Prabhakar Badri | Rudramurthy Shastry | Vani Jairam |
| Minchina Ota | "Baralide Hosa Ruthu" | Prabhakar Badri | Rudramurthy Shastry | solo |
| Moogana Sedu | "Jaadisi Odi" | Satyam | Chi. Udayashankar | S. Janaki |
| Moogana Sedu | "Bangaradha Bombeye" | Satyam | Chi. Udayashankar | S. Janaki |
| Moogana Sedu | "Nimagirali Naadu" | Satyam | Chi. Udayashankar | |
| Ondu Hennu Aaru Kannu | "Neene Neene" | S. Rajeswara Rao | Chi. Udaya Shankar | P. Susheela |
| Ondu Hennu Aaru Kannu | "Sannu Jaaridanamma" | S. Rajeswara Rao | Chi. Udaya Shankar | U. Ramakrishna |
| Ondu Hennu Aaru Kannu | "Ondu Eradu Mooru" | S. Rajeswara Rao | Chi. Udaya Shankar | Anand, U. Ramakrishna |
| Rahasya Rathri | "Sogasaagide Nage Chellide" | Shankar–Ganesh | Vijaya Narasimha | Vani Jairam |
| Rahasya Rathri | "Matkalli Muknalli" | Shankar–Ganesh | Vijaya Narasimha | L. R. Eswari, chorus |

=== 1981 ===
| Film | Song | Composer(s) | Writer(s) | Co-singer(s) |
|---|---|---|---|---|
| Antha | "Baaramma Illi Baaramma" | G. K. Venkatesh | Chi. Udaya Shankar, R. N. Jayagopal, Geethapriya | S. Janaki |
| Antha | "Naanu Yaaru Yaava Ooru" | G. K. Venkatesh | Chi. Udaya Shankar, R. N. Jayagopal, Geethapriya | solo |
| Avala Hejje | "Bandeya Baalina Belakaagi" | Rajan-Nagendra | Chi. Udayashankar | S. Janaki |
| Avala Hejje | "Aakasha Neeragali" | Rajan-Nagendra | Chi. Udayashankar | S. Janaki |
| Avala Hejje | "Neralanu Kaanada" | Rajan-Nagendra | Chi. Udayashankar | |
| Bhaari Bharjari Bete | "Bharjari Bete | Ilaiyaraaja | Chi. Udayashankar | solo |
| Bhaari Bharjari Bete | "Jee Boomba" | Ilaiyaraaja | Chi. Udayashankar | solo |
| Bhaari Bharjari Bete | "Sweety Nanna Jodi" | Ilaiyaraaja | Chi. Udayashankar | S. Janaki |
| Bhoomige Banda Bhagavantha | "Bhoomige Banda" | G. K. Venkatesh | Chi. Udaya Shankar | Vani Jairam |
| Garjane | "Bandeya Bandeya" | Ilaiyaraaja | Sreekumaran Thampi | S. Janaki |
| Garjane | "Kanna Minchinda" | Ilaiyaraaja | Sreekumaran Thampi | S. Janaki |
| Garjane | "Nadevaga" | Ilaiyaraaja | Sreekumaran Thampi | solo |
| Geetha | "Yene Kelu" | Ilaiyaraaja | Chi. Udaya Shankar | S. Janaki |
| Geetha | "Nanna Jeeva" | Ilaiyaraaja | Chi. Udaya Shankar | S. Janaki |
| Geetha | "Jotheyali" | Ilaiyaraaja | Chi. Udaya Shankar | S. Janaki |
| Geetha | "Geetha" | Ilaiyaraaja | Chi. Udaya Shankar | solo |
| Geetha | "Santhoshakke" | Ilaiyaraaja | Chi. Udaya Shankar | solo |
| Geetha | "Kelade Nimageega" | Ilaiyaraaja | Chi. Udaya Shankar | solo |
| Guru Shishyaru | "Ninagagi Ella Ninagagi" | K. V. Mahadevan | Chi. Udaya Shankar | S. Janaki |
| Guru Shishyaru | "Naachi Odidanu Madana" | K. V. Mahadevan | Chi. Udaya Shankar | S. Janaki |
| Guru Shishyaru | "Doddavarella Jaanaralla" | K. V. Mahadevan | Chi. Udaya Shankar | chorus |
| Maha Prachandaru | "Baayalli Neerooride" | Upendra Kumar | N/A | Vani Jairam |
| Maha Prachandaru | "Naa Ninna Kandaga" | Upendra Kumar | N/A | solo |
| Naga Kala Bhairava | "Chimmithu" | M. Ranga Rao | Vijaya Narasimha | Vani Jairam |
| Preethisi Nodu | "Balli Hoovigaasare" | Vijaya Bhaskar | Geethapriya | S. Janaki |
| Preethisi Nodu | "Preethisi Nodu" | Vijaya Bhaskar | Geethapriya | solo |
| Preethisi Nodu | "Hasive Doora" | Vijaya Bhaskar | Geethapriya | P. Padma, Choodamani |
| Raaga Thaala | "O Cheluve" | M. Ranga Rao | Nagireddy | Bangalore Latha |

=== 1982 ===
| Film | Song | Composer(s) | Writer(s) | Co-singer(s) |
|---|---|---|---|---|
| Baadada Hoo | Hoova Nodu Entha Andavagide" | L. Vaidyanathan | Chi. Udaya Shankar | S. Janaki |
| Baadada Hoo | "Neenendu Baadada Hoo" | L. Vaidyanathan | Chi. Udaya Shankar | S. Janaki |
| Baadada Hoo | "Nalivina Baalige" | L. Vaidyanathan | Chi. Udaya Shankar | solo |
| Hasyaratna Ramakrishna | "Anjaneya Swami Banda" | T. G. Lingappa | Chi. Udaya Shankar | solo |
| Jimmy Gallu | "Haadu Yaava Haadu" | Vijaya Bhaskar | Chi. Udaya Shankar | Vani Jairam |
| Jimmy Gallu | "Vayyari Mogava Nodu" | Vijaya Bhaskar | Chi. Udaya Shankar | Vani Jairam |
| Jimmy Gallu | "Deva Mandiradalli" | Vijaya Bhaskar | Chi. Udaya Shankar | Vani Jairam |
| Maanasa Sarovara | "Maanasa Sarovara" | Vijaya Bhaskar | Vijaya Naarasimha | Vani Jairam |
| Maanasa Sarovara | "Neene Sakida Gini" | Vijaya Bhaskar | Vijaya Naarasimha | solo |
| Nanna Devaru | "Manasu Ondada Mele" | Rajan-Nagendra | Chi. Udayashankar | S. Janaki |
| Nanna Devaru | "Baaro Muddina Nalla" | Rajan-Nagendra | Chi. Udayashankar | S. Janaki |
| Nanna Devaru | "Dundu Mallige Mathadeya" | Rajan-Nagendra | Chi. Udayashankar | solo |
| Suvarna Sethuve | "Ninna Konku Notava" | Vijaya Bhaskar | Geethapriya | Vani Jairam |

=== 1983 ===
| Film | Song | Composer(s) | Writer(s) | Co-singer(s) |
|---|---|---|---|---|
| Aasha | "Dance With Me" | G. K. Venkatesh | R. N. Jayagopal | P. Susheela |
| Aasha | "Nanda Deepa" | G. K. Venkatesh | R. N. Jayagopal | Vani Jairam |
| Ananda Bhairavi | "Malagiruveya Ranganatha" | Ramesh Naidu | N/A | S. Janaki |
| Ananda Bhairavi | "Haaduva Muraliya" | Ramesh Naidu | N/A | Vani Jairam |
| Ananda Bhairavi | "Chaitrada Kusumaanjali" | Ramesh Naidu | N/A | solo |
| Ananda Bhairavi | "Baa Baa Ba Raagavagi" | Ramesh Naidu | N/A | solo |
| Ananda Bhairavi | "Brahmanjali" | Ramesh Naidu | N/A | solo |
| Ananda Sagara | "Ananda Sagara Ee Samsara" | S. P. Balasubrahmanyam | R. N. Jayagopal | solo |
| Ananda Sagara | "Premada Sarigamake" | S. P. Balasubrahmanyam | R. N. Jayagopal | Vani Jairam |
| Avala Neralu | "Kaaveri Theerada Mele" | Joy Raja | R. N. Jayagopal | Vani Jairam |
| Avala Neralu | "Ninna Ballenu" | Joy Raja | Vijaya Narasimha | solo |
| Benkiya Bale | "Ninna Nagavu" | Rajan-Nagendra | Chi. Udayashankar | S. Janaki |
| Benkiya Bale | "Olida Jeeva" | Rajan-Nagendra | Chi. Udayashankar | S. Janaki |
| Benkiya Bale | "Nanagaagi Banda" | Rajan-Nagendra | Chi. Udayashankar | |
| Benkiya Bale | "Bisilaadarenu Maleyaadarenu" | Rajan-Nagendra | Chi. Udayashankar | |
| Benkiyalli Aralida Hoovu | "Taali Kattuva Shubhavele | M. S. Viswanathan | Chi. Udaya Shankar | solo |
| Benkiyalli Aralida Hoovu | "Munde Banni" | M. S. Viswanathan | Chi. Udaya Shankar | solo |
| Benkiyalli Aralida Hoovu | "Hogu Ennalu" | M. S. Viswanathan | Chi. Udaya Shankar | solo |
| Bhakta Prahlada | "Hari Hari Ennutha" | T. G. Lingappa | Chi. Udaya Shankar | solo |
| Dharani Mandala Madhyadolage | "Kaligalavayya Kaligala" | Vijaya Bhaskar | Siddalingaiah | solo |
| Dharani Mandala Madhyadolage | "Gelathi O Gelathi" | Vijaya Bhaskar | Siddalingaiah | solo |
| Gandugali Rama | "Nannane Deva" | C. Satyam | Geethapriya | solo |
| Gandugali Rama | "Naane Naane" | C. Satyam | Shyamsundar Kulkarni | solo |
| Gandugali Rama | "Ammamma Ninnannu" | C. Satyam | Chi. Udaya Shankar | Vani Jairam |
| Gandugali Rama | "Appa Ramanna" | C. Satyam | Chi. Udaya Shankar | S. Janaki |
| Geluvu Nannade | "Rojabeku Rojabeku" | T. G. Lingappa | N/A | S. Janaki |
| Geluvu Nannade | "Roja Hoove" | T. G. Lingappa | N/A | solo |
| Geluvu Nannade | "Geluvu Nannade" | T. G. Lingappa | N/A | S. N. Surendar |
| Hasida Hebbuli | "Savinenappu Yemanathe" | C. Satyam | N/A | S. Janaki |
| Hasida Hebbuli | "Praaya Matherithe" | C. Satyam | | S. Janaki |
| Hasida Hebbuli | "Yello Aathodhuddoru" | C. Satyam | solo | |
| Kaamana Billu | "Neenaadada Maathu" | Upendra Kumar | Chi. Udaya Shankar | Sulochana |
| Kalluveebe Nudiyithu | "Ee Sariganada" | M. Ranga Rao | Vijaya Narasimha | Bangalore Latha |
| Karune Illada Kanoonu | "Hareyada Cheluva Hoove" | Shankar–Ganesh | R. N. Jayagopal | S. Janaki |
| Karune Illada Kanoonu | "Thangiya Naduveya Madona" | Shankar–Ganesh | Doddarange Gowda | solo |
| Kranthiyogi Basavanna | "Shiva Shiva Mahadeva" | M. Ranga Rao | Maate Mahadevi | S. Janaki |
| Kranthiyogi Basavanna | "Januma Janumantarada" | M. Ranga Rao | Maate Mahadevi | S. Janaki |
| Kranthiyogi Basavanna | "Ella Ballidanaiah" | M. Ranga Rao | Maate Mahadevi | solo |
| Kranthiyogi Basavanna | "Jagadagala Mugilagala" | M. Ranga Rao | Shri Basaveshwara | solo |
| Kranthiyogi Basavanna | "Neera Kandalli" | M. Ranga Rao | Shri Basaveshwara | solo |
| Kranthiyogi Basavanna | "Kalalli Kattida Gundu" | M. Ranga Rao | Shri Basaveshwara | solo |
| Kranthiyogi Basavanna | "Vachanadalli Namamruta" | M. Ranga Rao | Shri Basaveshwara | solo |
| Kranthiyogi Basavanna | "Ullavaru Shivalayava" | M. Ranga Rao | Shri Basaveshwara | solo |
| Kranthiyogi Basavanna | "Kalabeda Kolabeda" | M. Ranga Rao | Shri Basaveshwara | solo |
| Kranthiyogi Basavanna | "Bhakthi Yemba Pruthvi" | M. Ranga Rao | Shri Basaveshwara | solo |
| Onde Guri | "Ee Bhavageethe" | Rajan-Nagendra | | |
| Onde Guri | "Nannaanegoo" | Rajan-Nagendra | | S. Janaki |
| Pallavi Anu Pallavi | "Naguva Nayana" | Ilaiyaraaja | R. N. Jayagopal | S. Janaki |
| Pallavi Anu Pallavi | "O Premi" | Ilaiyaraaja | R. N. Jayagopal | |
| Thirugu Baana | "Ide Naadu" | Sathyam | | |
| Thirugu Baana | "Snehakke Onde Maathu" | Sathyam | | |
| Thirugu Baana | "Andada Chandada Giniye" | Sathyam | | |
| Gedda Maga | "Ondu Gandu Hennu" | K. Chakravarthy | | S. Janaki |
| Gedda Maga | "Ravigintha Shashiye" | K. Chakravarthy | | S. Janaki |
| Gedda Maga | "Minchanthe Minchi" | K. Chakravarthy | | S. Janaki |
| Gedda Maga | "Love Me, Allow Me" | K. Chakravarthy | | S. Janaki |
| Kaamana Billu | "Neenaadada Maathu" | Upendra Kumar | | |
| Samarpane | "Manada Manada" | M. Ranga Rao | Vijaya Naarasimha | Vani Jairam |
| Samarpane | "Ee Baalinalli" | M. Ranga Rao | Vijaya Naarasimha | Vani Jairam |
| Samarpane | "Shubha Yoga Koodide" | M. Ranga Rao | Doddarange Gowda | Vani Jairam |
| Samarpane | "Premada Sukha" | M. Ranga Rao | Shyamasundara Kulkarni | solo |
| Sididedda Sahodara | "Hareyavu Karedide" | C. Satyam | R. N. Jayagopal | S. Janaki, Vani Jairam |
| Sididedda Sahodara | "Nanna Sama Yarilla" | C. Satyam | R. N. Jayagopal | S. Janaki |
| Sididedda Sahodara | "O Najuku Nalle" | C. Satyam | Geethapriya | solo |
| Sididedda Sahodara | "Duddu Idre" | C. Satyam | Geethapriya | solo |

=== 1984 ===
| Film | Song | Composer(s) | Writer(s) | Co-singer(s) |
|---|---|---|---|---|
| Anubhava | "Kaamana Dumbiya" | L. Vaidyanathan | V. Manohar | Vani Jairam |
| Bandhana | "Noorondu Nenapu" | M. Ranga Rao | R. N. Jayagopal | |
| Bandhana | "Banna Nanna Olavina" | M. Ranga Rao | R. N. Jayagopal | S. Janaki |
| Bandhana | "Premada Kadambari" | M. Ranga Rao | R. N. Jayagopal | |
| Eradu Rekhegalu | "Gangeya Kareyalli" | M. S. Viswanathan | R. N. Jayagopal | Vani Jairam |
| Huli Hejje | "Hoovu Mullu" | Vijaya Bhaskar | R. N. Jayagopal | Vani Jairam |
| Huli Hejje | "Amma Amma" | Vijaya Bhaskar | R. N. Jayagopal | solo |
| Indina Ramayana | "Nalleya Savimathe" | Vijayanand | Chi. Udaya Shankar | Vani Jairam |
| Indina Ramayana | "Oorella Ninna Hinde" | Vijayanand | Chi. Udaya Shankar | solo |
| Indina Ramayana | "Aase Hechchagide" | Vijayanand | Chi. Udaya Shankar | Manjula |
| Madhuve Madu Tamashe Nodu | "Santhoshada" | Vijayanand | R. N. Jayagopal | S. Janaki |
| Madhuve Madu Tamashe Nodu | "Naanu Neenu" | Vijayanand | R. N. Jayagopal | Manjula |
| Makkaliravva Mane Thumba | "Makkaliralavva Mane Thumba" | G. K. Venkatesh | Purandara Dasa and Doddarange Gowda | solo |
| Makkaliravva Mane Thumba | "Oh Usha Usha" | G. K. Venkatesh | Purandara Dasa and Doddarange Gowda | solo |
| Makkaliravva Mane Thumba | "Namma Gulabi" | G. K. Venkatesh | Purandara Dasa and Doddarange Gowda | solo |
| Rudranaga | "Cheluveya Kandu" | M. Ranga Rao | Shyama Sundara Kulakarni | Vani Jairam |
| Rudranaga | "Hoovinantha Manasone" | M. Ranga Rao | R. N. Jayagopal | Vani Jairam |
| Rudranaga | "Nannavva Bhoothayi" | M. Ranga Rao | R. N. Jayagopal | solo |
| Thaliya Bhagya | "Savira Mathugalethake" | C. Satyam | Chi. Udaya Shankar | S. Janaki |
| Thaliya Bhagya | "Kaanada Lokadi Neenu" | C. Satyam | Chi. Udaya Shankar | solo |

=== 1985 ===
| Film | Song | Composer(s) | Writer(s) | Co-singer(s) |
|---|---|---|---|---|
| Bettada Hoovu | "Bisile Irali Maleye Barali" | Rajan–Nagendra | | Puneeth Rajkumar |
| Bidugadeya Bedi | "Eno Hosa Santhoshade" | Rajan–Nagendra | R. N. Jayagopal | S. Janaki |
| Bidugadeya Bedi | "Manasugala Savi Milama" | Rajan–Nagendra | R. N. Jayagopal | S. Janaki |
| Bidugadeya Bedi | "Olavina Sarigama" | Rajan–Nagendra | R. N. Jayagopal | S. Janaki |
| Bidugadeya Bedi | "Naguva Hoovellavu" | Rajan–Nagendra | R. N. Jayagopal | solo |
| Hosa Neeru | "Neene Indu Prema Veene" | G. K. Venkatesh | R. N. Jayagopal | S. Janaki |
| Hosa Neeru | "Koreva Chaliyali" | G. K. Venkatesh | R. N. Jayagopal | S. Janaki |
| Hosa Neeru | "Olavu Thanda Besuge" | G. K. Venkatesh | R. N. Jayagopal | S. Janaki |
| Hosa Neeru | "Naavella Ondagi" | G. K. Venkatesh | R. N. Jayagopal | S. Janaki |
| Hosa Neeru | "Neene Nanna Preethi" | G. K. Venkatesh | R. N. Jayagopal | solo |
| Jeevana Chakra | "Ananda Ananda" | Rajan–Nagendra | Chi. Udaya Shankar | S. Janaki |
| Jeevana Chakra | "Aakashavu Ee Bhoomiyu" | Rajan–Nagendra | Chi. Udaya Shankar | S. Janaki |
| Jeevana Chakra | "Olleya Vayaside" | Rajan–Nagendra | Chi. Udaya Shankar | S. Janaki, Vani Jairam |
| Jeevana Chakra | "Nannavaru Yaaru Illa" | Rajan–Nagendra | Chi. Udaya Shankar | solo |
| Masanada Hoovu | "Yaava Kaanike Needali" | Vijaya Bhaskar | N/A | solo |
| Masanada Hoovu | "Masanada Hoovendu Neeneke" | Vijaya Bhaskar | N/A | solo |
| Naanu Nanna Hendthi | "Yaare Neenu Roja Hoove" | Shankar–Ganesh | Hamsalekha | solo |
| Naanu Nanna Hendthi | "Karunada Thayi" | Shankar–Ganesh | Hamsalekha | solo |
| Naanu Nanna Hendthi | "Akkipete Lakkamma" | Shankar–Ganesh | Hamsalekha | Vani Jairam |
| Nee Thanda Kanike | "Eno Ondu Hosa Jeevavu" | Vijayanand | R. N. Jayagopal | Vani Jairam |
| Nee Thanda Kanike | "Nee Needida Maathu Sullu" | Vijayanand | R. N. Jayagopal | Usha Ganesh |
| Nee Thanda Kanike | "Kannalli Preethi (duet) | Vijayanand | R. N. Jayagopal | B. R. Chaya |
| Nee Thanda Kanike | "Balemba Veeneyalli" | Vijayanand | R. N. Jayagopal | solo |
| Savira Sullu | "Aakasha Neenadare" | Shankar–Ganesh | N/A | S. Janaki |
| Savira Sullu | "Hennendarenu" | Shankar–Ganesh | N/A | S. Janaki |
| Savira Sullu | "Intha Ganda Node Illa" | Shankar–Ganesh | N/A | S. Janaki |
| Savira Sullu | "Kannere Ingithe" | Shankar–Ganesh | N/A | solo |
| Swabhimana | "Doorada Oorinda Hammera Banda" | Shankar-Ganesh | R. N. Jayagopal | S. Janaki |
| Swabhimana | "Ondu Eradu Mooru Beke" | Shankar-Ganesh | R. N. Jayagopal | S. Janaki |

=== 1986 ===
| Film | Song | Composer(s) | Writer(s) | Co-singer(s) |
|---|---|---|---|---|
| Anand | "Neela Megha" | Shankar–Ganesh | Chi. Udayashankar | S. Janaki |
| Anand | "Tuvvi Tuvvi" | Shankar–Ganesh | Chi. Udayashankar | |
| Anand | "Tick Tick" | Shankar–Ganesh | Chi. Udayashankar | |
| Anand | "Mogavu Chenna" | Shankar–Ganesh | Chi. Udayashankar | S. Janaki |
| Aruna Raaga | "Nadedado Kamanabillu " | Vijaya Bhaskar | Doddarangegowda | |
| Aruna Raaga | "Hagalu Rathri Sagide" | Vijaya Bhaskar | Doddarangegowda | |
| Bhagyada Lakshmi Baramma | "Bhagyada Lakshmi Baramma" | Singeetham Srinivasa Rao | Chi. Udaya Shankar | solo |
| Ee Jeeva Ninagagi | "Mannisu Endodane" | Vijayanand | | S. Janaki |
| Ee Jeeva Ninagagi | "Preethiyinda Ene Kelu" | Vijayanand | | solo |
| Hosa Neeru | "Neene Indu Prema Veene" | G. K. Venkatesh | R. N. Jayagopal | S. Janaki |
| Hosa Neeru | "Koreva Chaliyali" | G. K. Venkatesh | R. N. Jayagopal | S. Janaki |
| Hosa Neeru | "Olavu Thanda Besuge" | G. K. Venkatesh | R. N. Jayagopal | S. Janaki |
| Hosa Neeru | "Naavella Ondagi" | G. K. Venkatesh | R. N. Jayagopal | S. Janaki |
| Hosa Neeru | "Neene Nanna Preethi" | G. K. Venkatesh | R. N. Jayagopal | solo |
| Krishna Nee Begane Baro | "Mummy Mummy" | Bappi Lahiri | N/A | S. Janaki |
| Krishna Nee Begane Baro | "Mammayya" | Bappi Lahiri | N/A | solo |
| Krishna Nee Begane Baro | "Ee Baalalli" | Bappi Lahiri | N/A | solo |
| Malaya Marutha | "Adharam Madhuram " | Vijaya Bhaskar | Vallabha Acharya | Vani Jairam |
| Malaya Marutha | "Ee Sneha Ninnade" | Vijaya Bhaskar | R.N. Jayagopal | Vani Jairam |
| Mrugaalaya | "Aalaya Mrugaalaya " | Rajan-Nagendra | Chi. Udayashankar | |
| Mrugaalaya | "Kudure Savaariya" | Rajan-Nagendra | Chi. Udayashankar | Vani Jairam |
| Ratha Sapthami | "Shilegalu Sangeethava" | Upendra Kumar | Chi. Udaya Shankar | S. Janaki |
| Ratha Sapthami | "Jotheyagi Hithavagi" | Upendra Kumar | Chi. Udaya Shankar | S. Janaki |
| Ratha Sapthami | "Ananda Seri Haadalu" | Upendra Kumar | Chi. Udaya Shankar | solo |
| Ratha Sapthami | "Nee Yaaru Naan Yaaru" | Upendra Kumar | Chi. Udaya Shankar | solo |
| Ratha Sapthami | "Olave Hoovagi" | Upendra Kumar | Chi. Udaya Shankar | solo |
| Sathya Jyothi | "Nee Needida Prema" | Ilaiyaraaja | Chi. Udaya Shankar | S. Janaki |
| Sundara Swapnagalu | "Kshamisi Naa Helodella Thamashegagi | Vijaya Bhaskar | R. N. Jayagopal | S. P. Sailaja |

=== 1987 ===
| Film | Song | Composer(s) | Writer(s) | Co-singer(s) |
|---|---|---|---|---|
| Aaseya Bale | "Nanna Nalle Muddu Nallle" | Vijaya Bhaskar | Chi. Udaya Shankar | Vani Jairam |
| Aaseya Bale | "Elliruve Elliruve" | Vijaya Bhaskar | Chi. Udaya Shankar | Vani Jairam |
| Aaseya Bale | "Kanna Mucche" | Vijaya Bhaskar | R. N. Jayagopal | solo |
| Aaseya Bale | "Kanna Mucche" (sad) | Vijaya Bhaskar | R. N. Jayagopal | B. R. Chaya |
| Elu Suttina Kote | "Ee Shrusti" | L. Vaidyanathan | N/A | Vani Jairam |
| Elu Suttina Kote | "Eno Maadalu" | L. Vaidyanathan | N/A | solo |
| Elu Suttina Kote | "Antarangada Hoobanake" | L. Vaidyanathan | N/A | solo |
| Elu Suttina Kote | "Santasa Araluva Samaya" | L. Vaidyanathan | N/A | Rathnamala Prakash |
| Hrudaya Pallavi | "Akashadinda Banda" | M. Ranga Rao | R. N. Jayagopal | Vani Jairam |
| Hrudaya Pallavi | "Raagake Swaravagi" | M. Ranga Rao | R. N. Jayagopal | Vani Jairam |
| Hrudaya Pallavi | "Ramanama Payasakke" | M. Ranga Rao | Purandaradasa | Kasturi Shankar |
| Huli Hebbuli | "Mutthu Bedide" | Vijaya Bhaskar | Chi. Udaya Shankar | Vani Jairam |
| Huli Hebbuli | "Putta Putta Makkale" | Vijaya Bhaskar | Chi. Udaya Shankar | B. R. Chaya |
| Jayasimha | "Andha Andha" | Vijayanand | Chi. Udayashankar | S. Janaki |
| Jayasimha | "Appa Amma" | Vijayanand | Chi. Udayashankar | S. Janaki |
| Jayasimha | "Bigumaana" | Vijayanand | Chi. Udayashankar | Vani Jairam |
| Jayasimha | "Jayasimha" | Vijayanand | Chi. Udayashankar | solo |
| Jayasimha | "Kallalli Mullalli" | Vijayanand | Chi. Udayashankar | solo |
| Jayasimha | "Naguvaaga Hoovanthe" | Vijayanand | Chi. Udayashankar | solo |
| Hrudaya Pallavi | "Aakashadinda Banda" | M. Ranga Rao | R. N. Jayagopal | Vani Jairam |
| Hrudaya Pallavi | "Ragake Swaravaagi" | M. Ranga Rao | R. N. Jayagopal | Vani Jairam |
| Hrudaya Pallavi | "Ramanama Payasakke" | M. Ranga Rao | R. N. Jayagopal | Kasturi Shankar |
| Olavina Udugore | "Kannige Kaanada" | M. Ranga Rao | R. N. Jayagopal | solo |
| Olavina Udugore | "Ninnantha Cheluveyanu" | M. Ranga Rao | Shyamasundara Kulkarni | solo |
| Olavina Udugore | "Hrudaya Miditha" | M. Ranga Rao | Shyamasundara Kulkarni | Vani Jairam |
| Premaloka | "Nodamma Hudugi" | Hamsalekha | Rajashri | Latha Hamsalekha |
| Premaloka | "Cheluve Ondu Kelthini" | Hamsalekha | Rajashri | S. Janaki |
| Premaloka | "E Gangu Ee Biku Kalisikodu" | Hamsalekha | Rajashri | S. Janaki |
| Premaloka | "Idu Nanna Ninna Prema Geethe" | Hamsalekha | Rajashri | S. Janaki |
| Premaloka | "Geleyare Nanna Gelathiyare" | Hamsalekha | Rajashri | solo |
| Premaloka | "Mosagaarana" | Hamsalekha | Rajashri | solo |
| Sangrama | "Dandam Dashagunam" | Hamsalekha | | solo |
| Sangrama | "Vandane Nooru" | Hamsalekha | | solo |
| Sangrama | "Avasarapurada" | Hamsalekha | | solo |
| Sathwa Pareekshe | "Hogalu Raathri" | Vijaya Bhaskar | Chi. Udaya Shankar | solo |
| Sathwa Pareekshe | "Maranave Indalla" | Vijaya Bhaskar | Chi. Udaya Shankar | solo |
| Sathwa Pareekshe | "Modala Dinave" | Vijaya Bhaskar | Chi. Udaya Shankar | solo |
| Sathwa Pareekshe | "Preethi Endarenu" | Vijaya Bhaskar | Chi. Udaya Shankar | Manjula Gururaj |
| Sathyam Shivam Sundaram | "Dwesha Bandaaga" | K. Chakravarthy | Chi. Udayashankar | solo |
| Sathyam Shivam Sundaram | "Nanna Singariye" | K. Chakravarthy | Chi. Udayashankar | solo |
| Sathyam Shivam Sundaram | "Ide Reethi Yendu" | K. Chakravarthy | Chi. Udayashankar | K. S. Chithra |
| Sathyam Shivam Sundaram | "Naguthiruva Hoovagi" | K. Chakravarthy | Chi. Udayashankar | Ramani |
| Shubha Milana | "Milana Milana" | M. Ranga Rao | | S. Janaki |
| Shubha Milana | "Ee Chanchale Kuniyuvanthe" | M. Ranga Rao | | S. Janaki |
| Shubha Milana | "Baalu Pranaya Geethe" | M. Ranga Rao | | S. Janaki |
| Shubha Milana | "Krishnana Haage" | M. Ranga Rao | | S. Janaki |
| Shubha Milana | "Geleya Heege" | M. Ranga Rao | | S. Janaki |
| Shubha Milana | "Ninnaaseya Preethiya Hoovu" | M. Ranga Rao | | solo |
| Sowbhagya Lakshmi | "Innu Innu Noduvase" | S. P. Balasubrahmanyam | Chi. Udayashankar | S. P. Sailaja |
| Sowbhagya Lakshmi | "Hosa Kanasu Chiguri Manadali" | S. P. Balasubrahmanyam | Chi. Udayashankar | S. P. Sailaja |
| Sowbhagya Lakshmi | "Priya Priya Vinodave" | S. P. Balasubrahmanyam | Chi. Udayashankar | Vani Jairam |
| Sowbhagya Lakshmi | "Innellu Neenu Hogalaare" | S. P. Balasubrahmanyam | Chi. Udayashankar | Vani Jairam |
| Vijay | "Premigalanu" | M. Ranga Rao | | Vani Jairam |
| Vijay | "Ee Shubadinadi" | M. Ranga Rao | | solo |
| Vijay | "Niyatthu Illa" | M. Ranga Rao | | solo |
| Vijay | "Jhammane Naa" | M. Ranga Rao | | solo |
| Vijayotsava | "Sarigamapaga Paga" | M. Ranga Rao | | S. Janaki |
| Vijayotsava | "Kokkokko Ko Endu" | M. Ranga Rao | | solo |

=== 1988 ===
| Film | Song | Composer(s) | Writer(s) | Co-singer(s) |
|---|---|---|---|---|
| Anjada Gandu | "Preethiyalli Iro Sukha" | Hamsalekha | R. N. Jayagopal | Manjula Gururaj |
| Anjada Gandu | "Modala Baari" | Hamsalekha | R. N. Jayagopal | Manjula Gururaj |
| Anjada Gandu | "Eke Heegaytho" | Hamsalekha | R. N. Jayagopal | B. R. Chaya |
| Anjada Gandu | "Dumdum Dol" | Hamsalekha | Hamsalekha | B. R. Chaya |
| Avale Nanna Hendthi | "Neenu Hatthiravididdare" | Hamsalekha | Hamsalekha | Vani Jairam |
| Avale Nanna Hendthi | "Hey Hudugi" | Hamsalekha | Hamsalekha | Vani Jairam |
| Avale Nanna Hendthi | "Manasidu Hakkiya Goodu" | Hamsalekha | Hamsalekha | Latha Hamsalekha |
| Avale Nanna Hendthi | "Meese Hothha Gandasige" | Hamsalekha | Hamsalekha | solo |
| Balondu Bhavageethe | "Yauvvana Ondu" | Hamsalekha | R. N. Jayagopal | solo |
| Brahma Vishnu Maheshwara | "Endendigu Ondagi Heege" | Vijayanand | Chi. Udaya Shankar | Mano, Manohar |
| Brahma Vishnu Maheshwara | "Hudugiya Chenna" | Vijayanand | Chi. Udaya Shankar | S. Janaki |
| Brahma Vishnu Maheshwara | "Rathri Vele" | Vijayanand | Chi. Udaya Shankar | S. Janaki |
| Brahma Vishnu Maheshwara | "Aaha Enta Sambharamavu" | Vijayanand | Chi. Udaya Shankar | solo |
| Daada | "Hasivayasina" | Vijayanand | R. N. Jayagopal | Vani Jairam |
| Daada | "Nanna Cheluvane Rasikane" | Vijayanand | R. N. Jayagopal | Vani Jairam |
| Daada | "Ee Yauvvana" | Vijayanand | Chi. Udayashankar | Vani Jairam |
| Daada | "Dhairyavu Iralu" | Vijayanand | Chi. Udayashankar | solo |
| Daada | "Daada Daada Ee Droha" | Vijayanand | Shyamasundara Kulkarni | solo |
| Devatha Manushya | "Ide Jeevana" | Upendra Kumar | Chi. Udaya Shankar | solo |
| Dharmathma | "Hrudaya Veeneyu Meetide" | Rajan–Nagendra | Chi. Udaya Shankar | Vani Jairam |
| Dharmathma | "Hosadada Haadondanu Naa Haaduve" | Rajan–Nagendra | Chi. Udaya Shankar | Vani Jairam |
| Dharmathma | "Devara Makkalu Naavugalu" | Rajan–Nagendra | Chi. Udaya Shankar | solo |
| Dharmathma | Meetide Hosa Raaga" | Rajan–Nagendra | Chi. Udaya Shankar | solo |
| Dharmathma | "Chinna Chinna Onde Aase" | Rajan–Nagendra | Chi. Udaya Shankar | K. S. Chithra |
| Krishna Mechchida Radhe | "Preethi Dhaivavu" | Shankar–Ganesh | N/A | solo |
| Krishna Mechchida Radhe | "Olavina Kavitheya" | Shankar–Ganesh | N/A | solo |
| Krishna Mechchida Radhe | "Baalodu Hennida" | Shankar–Ganesh | N/A | solo |
| Krishna Rukmini | "Naa Kande Ninna Madhura" | K. V. Mahadevan | N/A | Vani Jairam |
| Krishna Rukmini | "Balukaado Banga" | K. V. Mahadevan | N/A | Vani Jairam |
| Krishna Rukmini | Cheluvina Chilume" | K. V. Mahadevan | N/A | Vani Jairam |
| Krishna Rukmini | "Naadave Nanninda Dooradeya" | K. V. Mahadevan | N/A | solo |
| Krishna Rukmini | "Karnatakada Itihaasadali" | K. V. Mahadevan | N/A | solo |
| Olavina Aasare | "Kanasali Manasali" | M. Ranga Rao | Doddarange Gowda | Vani Jairam |
| Olavina Aasare | "Ramananthe Nema" | M. Ranga Rao | Doddarange Gowda | solo |
| Olavina Aasare | "Sahasa Simha Endigu" | M. Ranga Rao | Doddarange Gowda | solo |
| Ramanna Shamanna | "Adhara Adhara Kalethaga" | S. P. Balasubrahmanyam | Chi. Udaya Shankar | Vani Jairam |
| Ramanna Shamanna | "Cheluve Olave" | S. P. Balasubrahmanyam | Chi. Udaya Shankar | Vani Jairam |
| Ramanna Shamanna | "Idu Enu Rabba" | S. P. Balasubrahmanyam | Chi. Udaya Shankar | solo |
| Ramanna Shamanna | "Entha Anandavo Rama" | S. P. Balasubrahmanyam | Chi. Udaya Shankar | solo |
| Ranadheera | "Baa Baaro Baaro Ranadheera" | Hamsalekha | Hamsalekha | S. Janaki |
| Ranadheera | "Preethi Maadabaaradu" | Hamsalekha | Hamsalekha | S. Janaki |
| Ranadheera | "Naavindu Haado Haadige Kone Illa" | Hamsalekha | Hamsalekha | S. Janaki |
| Ranadheera | "Yaare Neenu Sundara Cheluve" | Hamsalekha | Hamsalekha | S. Janaki |
| Ranadheera | "Meenakshi Ninna Kanna Mele" | Hamsalekha | Hamsalekha | solo |
| Ranadheera | "En Hudgiro Adyaaking Aadtiro | Hamsalekha | Hamsalekha | Master Manjunath, Vani Jayaram |
| Ranaranga | "Ninna Kannugalu" | Hamsalekha | Hamsalekha | Vani Jairam |
| Ranaranga | "Iva Yaava Seeme" | Hamsalekha | Hamsalekha | Vani Jairam |
| Ranaranga | "Meribedavo Shakuni Manuja" | Hamsalekha | Hamsalekha | solo |
| Samyuktha | "Preethiyo Premavo Mohavo" | Singeetham Srinivasa Rao | Chi. Udaya Shankar | Vani Jairam |
| Samyuktha | "Ee Namma Naade" | Singeetham Srinivasa Rao | Chi. Udaya Shankar | Mano, Ramesh |
| Samyuktha | "Aakasha Baagide" | Singeetham Srinivasa Rao | Chi. Udaya Shankar | solo |
| Samyuktha | "Mysoorinalli Mallige" | Singeetham Srinivasa Rao | Chi. Udaya Shankar | solo |
| Sangliyana | "Bandalo Bandalo Kanchana" | Hansalekha | Hamsalekha | Manjula Gururaj |
| Sangliyana | "Doorada Oorininda" | Hansalekha | Hamsalekha | Manjula Gururaj, chorus |
| Sangliyana | "Preethiyinda" | Hansalekha | Doddarange Gowda | Manjula Gururaj, B. R. Chaya |
| Shanti Nivasa | "Jubilee Silver Jubilee" | M. Ranga Rao | R. N. Jayagopal | Vani Jairam |
| Shanti Nivasa | "Mysoorininda Kai Hididu Banda" | M. Ranga Rao | R. N. Jayagopal | Vani Jairam |
| Shanti Nivasa | "Masaala Paan Masaala" | M. Ranga Rao | R. N. Jayagopal | Vani Jairam |
| Shanti Nivasa | "Ondu Hani Neeru" | M. Ranga Rao | R. N. Jayagopal | solo |
| Suprabhatha | "Nanna Haadu Nannadu" | Rajan–Nagendra | Chi. Udaya Shankar | solo |
| Suprabhatha | "Ee Hrudaya Haadide" | Rajan–Nagendra | Chi. Udaya Shankar | solo |
| Suprabhatha | "Cheluve Nanna Cheluve" | Rajan–Nagendra | Chi. Udaya Shankar | K. S. Chithra |
| Suprabhatha | "Aralida Aase" | Rajan–Nagendra | Chi. Udaya Shankar | K. S. Chithra |

=== 1989 ===
| Film | Song | Composer(s) | Writer(s) | Co-singer(s) |
|---|---|---|---|---|
| Ade Raaga Ade Haadu | "Anuragada Hosa" | Shankar–Ganesh | Chi. Udaya Shankar | Manjula Gururaj |
| Ade Raaga Ade Haadu | "Atthe Magala" | Shankar–Ganesh | Chi. Udaya Shankar | solo |
| Ade Raaga Ade Haadu | "Annayya Thammayya" | Shankar–Ganesh | Chi. Udaya Shankar | solo |
| Ade Raaga Ade Haadu | "Manasali Ninthe" | Shankar–Ganesh | Chi. Udaya Shankar | solo |
| Avatara Purusha | "Kulukutha Balakuve" | Vijayanand | | Vani Jairam |
| Avatara Purusha | "Saagarake Chandramana" | Vijayanand | | Vani Jairam |
| Avatara Purusha | "Prema Hrudayada" | Vijayanand | | Manjula Gururaj |
| Avatara Purusha | "Kannugala Thereyo" | Vijayanand | | solo |
| Deva | "Devanna Nina Mele" | Upendra Kumar | M. N. Vyasa Rao | S. Janaki |
| Deva | "Hendthi Beke" | Upendra Kumar | Chi. Udaya Shankar | chorus |
| Deva | "Thyagake Endendu" | Upendra Kumar | Geethapriya | chorus |
| Deva | "Suggi Banda" | Upendra Kumar | Shyamasundara Kulkarni | solo |
| Gandandre Gandu | "Ba Ba Ba Hejje Haaku" | G. K. Venkatesh | R. N. Jayagopal | Vani Jairam |
| Gandandre Gandu | "Ee Premada Hosa" | G. K. Venkatesh | R. N. Jayagopal | Vani Jairam |
| Gandandre Gandu | "Naane Raja Neene Raani" | G. K. Venkatesh | Chi. Udayashankar | solo |
| Hendthighelbedi | Madhura Maya | Vijayanand | Su. Rudramurthy Shastry | K. S. Chithra |
| Hendthighelbedi | "Rathri Bhaya" | Vijayanand | R. N. Jayagopal | solo |
| Hendthighelbedi | "Nambu Nanna Nalle" | Vijayanand | Shyamsundar Kulkarni | solo |
| Indrajith | "Belli Rathadali Surya" | Hamsalekha | Hamsalekha, KV Raju | B. R. Chaya |
| Indrajith | "Ide Ondu Kone Ide" | Hamsalekha | Hamsalekha | Chandrika Gururaj |
| Indrajith | "O Sundari" | Hamsalekha | Hamsalekha | P. Susheela |
| Indrajith | "Baaro Nanna Geleya" | Hamsalekha | Hamsalekha | solo |
| Jai Karnataka | "I Love You" | Vijayanand | N/A | Vani Jairam |
| Kindari Jogi | "Gange Baare Thunge Baare | Hamsalekha | Hamsalekha | S. Janaki |
| Kindari Jogi | "Kottalo Kottalamma" | Hamsalekha | Hamsalekha | S. Janaki |
| Kindari Jogi | "Ooru Uddara Madtheenantha " | Hamsalekha | Hamsalekha | S. Janaki |
| Kindari Jogi | "Aagallampe Hoogallampe" | Hamsalekha | Hamsalekha | S. Janaki |
| Kindari Jogi | "Chendina Baale" | Hamsalekha | Hamsalekha | S. Janaki |
| Kindari Jogi | "Haalakki Koogaithu" | Hamsalekha | Hamsalekha | S. Janaki |
| Krishna Nee Kunidaga | "Aaduvenu Nimagagi" | Vijayanand | Chi. Udayashankar | solo |
| Krishna Nee Kunidaga | "Minchante Bande" | Vijayanand | R. N. Jayagopal | solo |
| Krishna Nee Kunidaga | "Ee Kaalu Nondu" | Vijayanand | R. N. Jayagopal | solo |
| Krishna Nee Kunidaga | "Dhim Thana" | Vijayanand | R. N. Jayagopal | solo |
| Krishna Nee Kunidaga | "Dhama Dhamaru" | Vijayanand | R. N. Jayagopal | K. S. Chithra |
| Krishna Nee Kunidaga | "Praya Bandare Yaako" | Vijayanand | Hamsalekha | K. S. Chithra |
| Love Maadi Nodu | "Bangalore Teenage Henne" | L. Vaidyanathan | L. Vaidyanathan | Manjula Gururaj |
| Love Maadi Nodu | "Love Madu Madi Nodu" | L. Vaidyanathan | L. Vaidyanathan | Manjula Gururaj |
| Love Maadi Nodu | "Ninna Nodo Aaseyali" | L. Vaidyanathan | L. Vaidyanathan | Manjula Gururaj |
| Mana Mecchida Sose | "Chandada Gini" | Upendra Kumar | Chi. Udaya Shankar | Sangeetha Katti |
| Mana Mecchida Sose | "Naane Haadide" | Upendra Kumar | Chi. Udaya Shankar | Sangeetha Katti |
| Mana Mecchida Sose | "Neene Swarada Shrungara" | Upendra Kumar | Chi. Udaya Shankar | solo |
| Nanjundi Kalyana | "Innu Gyaaranti" | Upendra Kumar | Chi. Udayashankar | Mohan Jimpets, Chorus |
| Poli Huduga | "Yaaru Poli" | Hamsalekha | Hamsalekha | Manjula Gururaj |
| Poli Huduga | "Kuhu Kuhu Kogile" | Hamsalekha | Hamsalekha | Latha Hamsalekha |
| Poli Huduga | "Jokumarane" | Hamsalekha | Hamsalekha | Vani Jairam |
| Poli Huduga | "Aa Suryana Sutthodu" | Hamsalekha | Hamsalekha | Vani Jairam |
| Poli Huduga | "Janana Marana" | Hamsalekha | Hamsalekha | solo |
| Poli Huduga | "Mugiyitu Aa Kaalavu" | Hamsalekha | Hamsalekha | solo |
| Yuddha Kaanda | "Kudiyodhe Nanna" | Hamsalekha | Hamsalekha | solo |
| Yuddha Kaanda | "Solle Illa" (bit.) | Hamsalekha | Hamsalekha | solo |
| Yuddha Kaanda | "Sole Illa" (duet) | Hamsalekha | Hamsalekha | S. Janaki |
| Yuddha Kaanda | "Sole Illa" (sad) | Hamsalekha | Hamsalekha | S. Janaki |
| Yuddha Kaanda | "Kempu Thotadalli" | Hamsalekha | Hamsalekha | Vani Jairam, B. R. Chaya |
| Yuddha Kaanda | "Bolo Re Shanthi" | Hamsalekha | Hamsalekha | B. R. Chaya |
| Yuddha Kaanda | "Nooraroorugalalli" | Hamsalekha | Hamsalekha | Vani Jairam |
| Yuddha Kaanda | "Sa Ri Ga Ma" | Hamsalekha | Hamsalekha | Latha Hamsalekha |
| Yuddha Kaanda | "Muddina Gini" | Hamsalekha | Hamsalekha | Manjula Gururaj |

=== 1990 ===
| Film | Song | Composer(s) | Writer(s) | Co-singer(s) |
|---|---|---|---|---|
| Bannada Gejje | "Swathi Mutthina Male Haniye" | Hamsalekha | Hamsalekha | S. Janaki |
| Bannada Gejje | "Dance Dance" | Hamsalekha | Hamsalekha | S. Janaki |
| Bannada Gejje | "Jodusthinayyo Brahma Ninge" | Hamsalekha | Hamsalekha | S. Janaki |
| Bannada Gejje | "He Enele Mari Koose" | Hamsalekha | Hamsalekha | Mano |
| Bannada Gejje | "Yoga Yoga" | Hamsalekha | Hamsalekha | Latha Hamsalekha |
| Hosa Jeevana | "Byadve Byadve" | Hamsalekha | Hamsalekha | Manjula Gururaj |
| Hosa Jeevana | "Laali Laali" | Hamsalekha | Hamsalekha | Manjula Gururaj |
| Hosa Jeevana | "Chaaku Chainu" | Hamsalekha | Hamsalekha | solo |
| Muthina Haara | "Madikeri Sipaayi" | Hamsalekha | Hamsalekha | K. S. Chithra |
| Muthina Haara | "Kodagina Veera" | Hamsalekha | Hamsalekha | K. S. Chithra |
| Muthina Haara | "Kodaginolu Bedaginolu" | Hamsalekha | Hamsalekha | solo |
| Muthina Haara | "Saaru Saaru Miltry Saaru" | Hamsalekha | Hamsalekha | Latha Hamsalekha |

=== 1991 ===
| Film | Song | Composer(s) | Writer(s) | Co-singer(s) |
|---|---|---|---|---|
| Girimallile | "Mallige Giri Mallige" | M. Ranga Rao | N/A | solo |
| Halli Rambhe Belli Bombe | "Andu Ninna Serida" | Upendra Kumar | Chi. Udaya Shankar | Chorus |
| Halli Rambhe Belli Bombe | "O Chandrane Baaro Bego" | Upendra Kumar | Chi. Udaya Shankar | solo |
| Halli Rambhe Belli Bombe | "Eko Kaane Nange Nachike" | Upendra Kumar | Chi. Udaya Shankar | S. Janaki |
| Hrudaya Haadithu | "Giri Navilu Yello", "Thampada Gaali Beesali", "O Nanna Mallige" | Upendra Kumar | Chi. Udayashankar | Manjula Gururaj |
| Iduve Jeevana | "Iduve Jeevana" | Vijaya Bhaskar | | solo |
| Iduve Jeevana | "Nyaya Neethi" | Vijaya Bhaskar | | solo |
| Iduve Jeevana | "Jarda Beeda Haakidange" | Vijaya Bhaskar | | Manjula Gururaj |
| Iduve Jeevana | "Appane Samarpane" | Vijaya Bhaskar | | Vani Jairam |
| Keralinda Kesari | "Bete Aado Bayaki" | Sangeetha Raja | | solo |
| Keralinda Kesari | "Badukella Heegayitheke" | Sangeetha Raja | | solo |
| Keralinda Kesari | "Mucchitta Maatha" | Sangeetha Raja | | Vani Jairam |
| Keralinda Kesari | "Thengina Thotdaage" | Sangeetha Raja | | Vani Jairam |
| Police Matthu Dada | "O Nannase" | Bappi Lahiri | N/A | S. Janaki |
| Police Matthu Dada | "Naanu Garam Garam" | Bappi Lahiri | N/A | S. Janaki |
| Police Matthu Dada | "Ayyayya Ho" | Bappi Lahiri | N/A | solo |
| Police Matthu Dada | "Nanna Manadali" | Bappi Lahiri | N/A | K. S. Chitra |
| Shanti Kranti | "Madhyarathrili" | Hamsalekha | N/A | S. Janaki, Mano & chorus |
| Shanti Kranti | "Swathantra Baanali" | Hamsalekha | N/A | S. Janaki |
| Shanti Kranti | "Gaaliyo Gaaliyo" | Hamsalekha | N/A | S. Janaki |
| Shanti Kranti | "Aaane Mele" | Hamsalekha | N/A | S. Janaki |
| Shanti Kranti | "Anatha Bhanduve" | Hamsalekha | N/A | S. Janaki |
| Shanti Kranti | "Bandano Yamaraya" | Hamsalekha | N/A | S. Janaki |
| Shanti Kranti | "Iddare Iddare" | Hamsalekha | N/A | solo |
| Shanti Kranti | "One Two Three" | Hamsalekha | N/A | K. S. Chithra |
| Ranachandi | "Naanu Yaaro" | Sax Raja | | K. S. Chithra |
| Ranachandi | "Huccharu Naavu Huccharu" | Sax Raja | | K. S. Chithra |
| Ranachandi | "Geetha I Love You" | Sax Raja | | K. S. Chithra |

=== 1992 ===
| Film | Song | Composer(s) | Writer(s) | Co-singer(s) |
|---|---|---|---|---|
| Aathma Bandhana | "Prema Yendare Yenu" | Hamsalekha | Chi. Udaya Shankar | K. S. Chithra |
| Aathma Bandhana | "Hatthira Hatthira Nee" | Hamsalekha | Chi. Udaya Shankar | K. S. Chithra |
| Aathma Bandhana | "Nanna Hrudayadalli" | Hamsalekha | Chi. Udaya Shankar | K. S. Chithra |
| Agni Panjara | "Joojhadidhe" | Vijay Anand | N/A | solo |
| Agni Panjara | "Mugiyithe" | Vijay Anand | N/A | solo |
| Amara Prema | "Rambaa Baa" | Upendra Kumar | N/A | Chorus |
| Amara Prema | "Prema Hrudayagalu" | Upendra Kumar | N/A | Sangeetha Katti |
| Amara Prema | "Beeravva Maaravva" | Upendra Kumar | N/A | Manjula Gururaj |
| Athi Madhura Anuraga | "Nanna Preethiya Raja" | Hamsalekha | | Latha Hamsalekha |
| Athi Madhura Anuraga | "Pyatyorella Doddavaralla" | Hamsalekha | | solo |
| Athi Madhura Anuraga | "Munjaane Surya Hongirana" | Hamsalekha | | K. S. Chithra |
| Baa Nanna Preethisu | "Andu Ninna Kandaagale" | Rajan–Nagendra | N/A | Manjula Gururaj |
| Baa Nanna Preethisu | "Manadaase Nooru" | Rajan–Nagendra | N/A | Manjula Gururaj |
| Baa Nanna Preethisu | "Ondu Beku Eradu Saaku" | Rajan–Nagendra | N/A | Manjula Gururaj |
| Baa Nanna Preethisu | "Baaro Baaro Maleraaya" | Rajan–Nagendra | N/A | solo |
| Baa Nanna Preethisu | "Kempegowdre" | Rajan–Nagendra | N/A | solo |
| Banni Ondsala Nodi | "Elli Nodadalli" | Upendra Kumar | M. D. Hasham | Manjula Gururaj |
| Banni Ondsala Nodi | "Naa Bareda Geetheya" | Upendra Kumar | M. D. Hasham | Sangeetha Katti |
| Banni Ondsala Nodi | "Haadona Hosa Haadanu" | Upendra Kumar | Chi. Udaya Shankar | Sangeetha Katti |
| Banni Ondsala Nodi | "Preethi Namagaagi" | Upendra Kumar | M. N. Vyasa Rao | Sangeetha Katti, Kusuma |
| Belli Kalungura | ""Kelisade Kallukallinali" (Male version)" | Hamsalekha | Doddarange Gowda | solo |
| Belli Kalungura | "Onde Ondu (Male Version)" | Hamsalekha | Hamsalekha | solo |
| Belli Kalungura | "Maama Maama Chandamama" | Hamsalekha | Hamsalekha | K. S. Chithra |
| Belliyappa Bangarappa | "Beda Doora Hogayya | S. P. Balasubrahmanyam | Chi. Udaya Shankar | K. S. Chithra |
| Belliyappa Bangarappa | "Belli Modada Mareya" | S. P. Balasubrahmanyam | Chi. Udaya Shankar | K. S. Chithra |
| Belliyappa Bangarappa | "Ninna Notake" | S. P. Balasubrahmanyam | Chi. Udaya Shankar | K. S. Chithra |
| Belliyappa Bangarappa | "Sannamma Naanaru" | S. P. Balasubrahmanyam | Chi. Udaya Shankar | K. S. Chithra |
| Belliyappa Bangarappa | "Dinaku Dina Dinnanaa" | S. P. Balasubrahmanyam | Chi. Udaya Shankar | solo |
| Bombat Hendthi | "Kaaranji Haage" | Upendra Kumar | R. N. Jayagopal. | Sangeetha Katti |
| Bombat Hendthi | "Naanondu Maduve" | Upendra Kumar | R. N. Jayagopal. | solo |
| Bombat Hendthi | "Bengalooru Nagarada" | Upendra Kumar | R. N. Jayagopal. | solo |
| Bombat Hendthi | "Love Love" | Upendra Kumar | R. N. Jayagopal. | Manjula Gururaj |
| Chaitrada Premanjali | "O Kogile" | Hamsalekha | Hamsalekha | solo |
| Chaitrada Premanjali | "Dance Dance" | Hamsalekha | Hamsalekha | solo |
| Chaitrada Premanjali | "O Malenadina" | Hamsalekha | Hamsalekha | K. S. Chithra |
| Chaitrada Premanjali | "Nannavare Nanage" | Hamsalekha | Hamsalekha | Manjula Gururaj |
| Chaitrada Premanjali | "Chaitrada Premanjaliya" | Hamsalekha | Hamsalekha | Chandrika Gururaj |
| Chikkejamanru | "Rama Rama Rama | Hamsalekha | Hamsalekha | S. Janaki |
| Chikkejamanru | "Sobane Enniramma" | Hamsalekha | Hamsalekha | S. Janaki |
| Chikkejamanru | "Rama Rama Rama (sad) | Hamsalekha | Hamsalekha | S. Janaki |
| Chikkejamanru | Nammura Nyaya Devaru" | Hamsalekha | Hamsalekha | K. S. Chithra |
| Chikkejamanru | "Buguri Buguri" | Hamsalekha | Hamsalekha | K. S. Chithra |
| Chikkejamanru | "Premada Hoogara" | Hamsalekha | Hamsalekha | solo |
| Chitralekha | "Belladinde" | Hamsalekha | | solo |
| Chitralekha | "Mandaakini Nannaake Nee" | Hamsalekha | | solo |
| Chitralekha | "Neenu Hennu" | Hamsalekha | | K. S. Chithra |
| Chitralekha | "Ramanennalenu Ninna" | Hamsalekha | | K. S. Chithra |
| Edurmaneli Ganda Pakkadmaneli Hendthi | "Ammayya Ammayya" | Raj–Koti | R. N. Jayagopal | Manjula Gururaj |
| Edurmaneli Ganda Pakkadmaneli Hendthi | "Kannu Bitthu" | Raj–Koti | R. N. Jayagopal | Manjula Gururaj |
| Edurmaneli Ganda Pakkadmaneli Hendthi | "Ek Do Teen" | Raj–Koti | R. N. Jayagopal | Manjula Gururaj |
| Edurmaneli Ganda Pakkadmaneli Hendthi | "Meghavu Hariside" | Raj–Koti | R. N. Jayagopal | K. S. Chithra |
| Entede Bhanta | ! Utta Batteyali" | Hamsalekha | Hamsalekha | Manjula Gururaj |
| Entede Bhanta | "Hunnimeya Rathrige" | Hamsalekha | Hamsalekha | Manjula Gururaj |
| Entede Bhanta | "Obbaninda Enoo Agadu" | Hamsalekha | Hamsalekha | solo |
| Gandharva | "Enthanada Maanarava" | Hamsalekha | Hamsalekha | solo |
| Gili Bete | "Tangaali Maiyya" | Manoranjan Prabhakar | N/A | Manjula Gururaj |
| Gili Bete | "Ee Nanna Haadu" | Manoranjan Prabhakar | N/A | solo |
| Gili Bete | "Mounada Shrugaara Geethe" | Manoranjan Prabhakar | N/A | B. R. Chhaya |
| Goonda Rajya | "Kannu Kanda Daiva" | Upendra Kumar | | Sangeeta Katti |
| Goonda Rajya | "Nee Santhosha Chellaadidhe" | Upendra Kumar | | Sangeeta Katti |
| Goonda Rajya | "Kannu Kanda" (sad) | Upendra Kumar | | Sangeeta Katti |
| Goonda Rajya | "Yelu Yelu Yedhelu" | Upendra Kumar | | Sangeeta Katti |
| Gruhalakshmi | "Premium Mellage Baa Mellage" | Raj–Koti | | K. S. Chithra |
| Gruhalakshmi | "Kho Kho Ababba" | Raj–Koti | | K. S. Chithra |
| Gruhalakshmi | "Aluvudu Yeke" | Raj–Koti | | solo |
| Halli Meshtru | "Kaayi Kaayi Nugge Kaayi" | Hamsalekha | Hamsalekha | S. Janaki |
| Halli Meshtru | "Sankranthi Bantu" | Hamsalekha | Hamsalekha | S. Janaki |
| Halli Meshtru | "Halli Meshtre Halli Meshtre" | Hamsalekha | Hamsalekha | S. Janaki |
| Hatamari Hennu Kiladi | "Hejje Mele Hejje" | Rajan–Nagendra | Chi. Udaya Shankar | K. S. Chithra |
| Hatamari Hennu Kiladi | "Barede Ninna Hesarannu" | Rajan–Nagendra | Chi. Udaya Shankar | K. S. Chithra |
| Hatamari Hennu Kiladi | "Banni Banni Nammavare" | Rajan–Nagendra | Chi. Udaya Shankar | solo |
| Hendtheere Hushar | "Madhuve Kareyole" | Upendra Kumar | R. N. Jayagopal | Sangeetha Katti |
| Hendtheere Hushar | "Seethapathi" | Upendra Kumar | R. N. Jayagopal | Sangeetha Katti |
| Hendtheere Hushar | "Idhu Manmatha Samrajya" | Upendra Kumar | R. N. Jayagopal | Sangeetha Katti |
| Hendtheere Hushar | "Prema Bandhithu" | Upendra Kumar | R. N. Jayagopal | Sangeetha Katti |
| Hendtheere Hushar | "Mava O Mava" | Upendra Kumar | R. N. Jayagopal | K. S. Chithra |
| Jhenkara | "Kande Kande" | Hamsalekha | Hamsalekha | K. S. Chithra |
| Jhenkara | "Naanu Neenu Bereyaadare" | Hamsalekha | Hamsalekha | K. S. Chithra |
| Jhenkara | "Namma Collegenalli" | Hamsalekha | Hamsalekha | K. S. Chithra |
| Jhenkara | "Thanu Olage Olava" | Hamsalekha | Hamsalekha | K. S. Chithra |
| Jhenkara | "Yaru Vairi" | Hamsalekha | Hamsalekha | solo |
| Kaliyuga Seethe | "Dinavu Nalide" | Rajan–Nagendra | Chi. Udaya Shankar | K. S. Chithra |
| Kaliyuga Seethe | "Sarasa Sarasa" | Rajan–Nagendra | Chi. Udaya Shankar | K. S. Chithra |
| Kanasina Rani | "Bhoomigilidha Rambheyanthe" | Upendra Kumar | N/A | solo |
| Kanasina Rani | "Muniseke Biruseke" | Upendra Kumar | N/A | solo |
| Kranthi Gandhi | "Ellina Ee Kshana" | Guna Singh | N/A | K. S. Chithra |
| Kranthi Gandhi | "Naadina Nija" | Guna Singh | N/A | solo |
| Kranthi Gandhi | "Bannada Jagada" | Guna Singh | N/A | solo |
| Ksheera Sagara | "Hodithale Badithale" | Hamsalekha | Hamsalekha | solo |
| Ksheera Sagara | "Kalyani Kalyani" | Hamsalekha | Hamsalekha | K. S. Chithra |
| Ksheera Sagara | "Priya Priya" | Hamsalekha | Hamsalekha | K. S. Chithra |
| Ksheera Sagara | "Yaakla Patnasara" | Hamsalekha | Hamsalekha | K. S. Chithra |
| Ksheera Sagara | "Mysore Hennige" | Hamsalekha | Hamsalekha | K. S. Chithra |
| Malashree Mamashree | "Bandano Bhoomige" | Raj–Koti | R. N. Jayagopal | K. S. Chithra |
| Malashree Mamashree | "Yaarava Shilpi" | Raj–Koti | R. N. Jayagopal | K. S. Chithra |
| Malashree Mamashree | "Ninnalli Ondadenu" | Raj–Koti | R. N. Jayagopal | K. S. Chithra |
| Malashree Mamashree | "Baaro Nanna" | Raj–Koti | R. N. Jayagopal | Chandrika Gururaj, Manjula Gururaj |
| Mannina Doni | "Male Male Male Male" | Hamsalekha | Hamsalekha | K. S. Chithra |
| Mannina Doni | "Nandu Nindu Indu" | Hamsalekha | Hamsalekha | K. S. Chithra |
| Mannina Doni | "Rajanu Rani" | Hamsalekha | Hamsalekha | K. S. Chithra |
| Marana Mrudanga | "Dava Dava" | Hamsalekha | Hamsalekha | Manjula Gururaj |
| Marana Mrudanga | "Delhiyagali Halliyagali" | Hamsalekha | Hamsalekha | Manjula Gururaj |
| Marana Mrudanga | "Bhoomi Aakasha" | Hamsalekha | Hamsalekha | Manjula Gururaj |
| Mavanige Thakka Aliya | "Kannalli Neenu" | Shankar–Ganesh | N/A | Manjula Gururaj |
| Mavanige Thakka Aliya | "Kempu Suryanu" | Shankar–Ganesh | N/A | solo |
| Mavanige Thakka Aliya | "Lalithe Devi" | Shankar–Ganesh | N/A | solo |
| Mavanige Thakka Aliya | "Manada Aase" | Shankar–Ganesh | N/A | solo |
| Mavanige Thakka Aliya | "Mashkara Mam Mam" | Shankar–Ganesh | N/A | solo |
| Megha Mandara | "Asha Gopura" | S. P. Venkatesh | Doddarange Gowda | solo |
| Megha Mandara | "Mandara Ee Megha" | S. P. Venkatesh | Doddarange Gowda | solo |
| Megha Mandara | "Nanna Mandara" | S. P. Venkatesh | Doddarange Gowda | K. S. Chithra |
| Megha Mandara | "Daddy Preethi" | S. P. Venkatesh | Doddarange Gowda | K. S. Chithra |
| Midida Shruthi | "Aa Surya Chandra | Upendra Kumar | M. N. Vyasa Rao | Manjula Gururaj |
| Midida Shruthi | "Yaavudu Preethi" | Upendra Kumar | M. N. Vyasa Rao | Manjula Gururaj |
| Midida Shruthi | "Nanna Ninna Aase" | Upendra Kumar | Geethapriya | Manjula Gururaj |
| Midida Shruthi | "Bannada Okuli" | Upendra Kumar | Sri Ranga | Manjula Gururaj |
| Midida Shruthi | "Nenedodane America" | Upendra Kumar | solo | |
| Mysore Jaana | "Hero Handsome Hero" | Rajan–Nagendra | R. N. Jayagopal | Manjula Gururaj |
| Mysore Jaana | "Snehada Sanketavagi" | Rajan–Nagendra | R. N. Jayagopal | Manjula Gururaj |
| Mysore Jaana | "Allaudin Chiragu Thande" | Rajan–Nagendra | R. N. Jayagopal | Manjula Gururaj |
| Mysore Jaana | "Suryakanthi Raviya Marethu | Rajan–Nagendra | R. N. Jayagopal | Uma Ganesh |
| Mysore Jaana | "Jaana Jaana Mysore Jaana" | Rajan–Nagendra | Shyamsundar Kulkarni | Uma Ganesh |
| Nagaradalli Nayakaru | "Oh Priyathama" | Raj–Koti | R. N. Jayagopal | K. S. Chitra |
| Nagaradalli Nayakaru | "My Darling Sweety" | Raj–Koti | R. N. Jayagopal | K. S. Chitra |
| Nanna Shathru | "Jodiyada Dampathi" | Rajan–Nagendra | Sriranga | K. S. Chithra |
| Nanna Shathru | "Maagi Bandaythu" | Rajan–Nagendra | Chi. Udayashankar | K. S. Chithra |
| Nanna Shathru | "Nee Nanna Yene Andaru" | Rajan–Nagendra | Shyamsundar Kulkarni | K. S. Chithra |
| Nanna Shathru | "Abbabba Ninna Muttalu" | Rajan–Nagendra | Geethapriya | K. S. Chithra |
| Nanna Shathru | "Ellelli Nodali" | Rajan–Nagendra | Chi. Udayashankar | K. S. Chithra |
| Nanna Thangi | "Oh Madhuri" | Hamsalekha | | K. S. Chithra |
| Nanna Thangi | "Kotta Kotta" | Hamsalekha | | Manjula Gururaj |
| Nanna Thangi | "Nanna Maduva" | Hamsalekha | | Latha Hamsalekha |
| Obbarigintha Obbaru | "Bangari Nanna Aane" | S. A. Rajkumar | | Manjula Gururaj |
| Obbarigintha Obbaru | "Salaamu Haakuve" | S. A. Rajkumar | | Manjula Gururaj, S. Aman |
| Obbarigintha Obbaru | "Naa Kalla, Nee Kalla" | S. A. Rajkumar | | solo |
| Obbarigintha Obbaru | "Hana Hana" | S. A. Rajkumar | | solo |
| Ondu Cinema Kathe | "Kannada Honnudi" | Rajan–Nagendra | Shyamsundar Kulkarni | solo |
| Ondu Cinema Kathe | "Olavina Prema Gange" | Rajan–Nagendra | Chi. Udaya Shankar | solo |
| Police File | "Kanaka Kanaka O Kanaka" | Hamsalekha | | Manjula Gururaj |
| Police File | "Minuku Deepa" | Hamsalekha | | Latha Hamsalekha |
| Police File | "Naanu Ondu Kaadambari" | Hamsalekha | | K.S. Chithra |
| Police Lockup | "Jumma Chekka" | V. Manohar | V. Manohar | S. Janaki |
| Police Lockup | "Akasha Bhumiyella" | V. Manohar | V. Manohar | solo |
| Police Lockup | "Akasha Bhumiyella" (sad) | V. Manohar | V. Manohar | solo |
| Police Lockup | "Ayyayyo Kettu Hoyithu" | V. Manohar | V. Manohar | solo |
| Police Lockup | "Hima Hima Manjina" | V. Manohar | V. Manohar | Sheela Krishnamurthy |
| Prajegalu Prabhugalu | "Prajegala Hesaralli" | Manoranjan Prabhakar | N/A | solo |
| Prema Sangama | "Chanda O Chanda" | Rajan–Nagendra | Chi. Udaya Shankar, Su. Rudramurthy Shastry, Shyamsundar Kulkarni and Sri Raga | solo |
| Prema Sangama | "Nanna Jodi Neenu" | Rajan–Nagendra | Chi. Udaya Shankar, Su. Rudramurthy Shastry, Shyamsundar Kulkarni and Sri Raga | Manjula Gururaj |
| Prema Sangama | "Preethi I Love You" | Rajan–Nagendra | Chi. Udaya Shankar, Su. Rudramurthy Shastry, Shyamsundar Kulkarni and Sri Raga | Manjula Gururaj |
| Prema Sangama | "Honna Kogile" | Rajan–Nagendra | Chi. Udaya Shankar, Su. Rudramurthy Shastry, Shyamsundar Kulkarni and Sri Raga | K. S. Chithra |
| Prema Sangama | "Jolly Day One Day" | Rajan–Nagendra | Chi. Udaya Shankar, Su. Rudramurthy Shastry, Shyamsundar Kulkarni and Sri Raga | K. S. Chithra |
| Purushotthama | "Madhuvade Neenu" | Hamsalekha | Hamsalekha | Manjula Gururaj |
| Purushotthama | "Supero Supero Hudugi | Hamsalekha | Hamsalekha | Manjula Gururaj, K. S. Chithra |
| Rajadhi Raja | "Ninnalliro Anda" | Vijayanand | | K. S. Chithra |
| Rajadhi Raja | "Daba Daba" | Vijayanand | | K. S. Chithra |
| Rajadhi Raja | "Baa Priya Daamini" | Vijayanand | | solo |
| Rajadhi Raja | "Rajadhiraja" | Vijayanand | | solo |
| Rajadhi Raja | "Sambhanda Churaagi" | Vijayanand | | solo |
| Sahasi | "Kogile Kogile" | Hamsalekha | Hamsalekha | K. S. Chithra |
| Sahasi | "Saadisi Thorisu Sahasi" | Hamsalekha | Hamsalekha | solo |
| Sahasi | "Hasiru Baliya Kesari Jhanda" (male) | Hamsalekha | Hamsalekha | solo |
| Sahasi | "Swatantra Thanda" | Hamsalekha | Hamsalekha | solo |
| Saptapadi | "Chinna Nanna" | Upendra Kumar | Chi. Udaya Shankar | Manjula Gururaj |
| Saptapadi | "Koneyalli Mancha" | Upendra Kumar | Chi. Udaya Shankar | Manjula Gururaj |
| Saptapadi | "Baalali Vivaahada" | Upendra Kumar | Chi. Udaya Shankar | Sangeetha Katti |
| Saptapadi | "Hoovu Mullu" | Upendra Kumar | Chi. Udaya Shankar | |
| Shakthi Yukthi | "Nee Muttudre" | Manoranjan Prabhakar | N/A | S. Janaki |
| Shakthi Yukthi | "Shiva Raathri" | Manoranjan Prabhakar | N/A | K. S. Chithra |
| Shakthi Yukthi | "Sundari Neenu" | Manoranjan Prabhakar | N/A | |
| Shakthi Yukthi | "Nalle Ninna Mudige" | Manoranjan Prabhakar | N/A | |
| Shakthi Yukthi | "Ee Jeevadalli" | Manoranjan Prabhakar | N/A | |
| Shakthi Yukthi | "Kaasinagala Kumkuma" | Manoranjan Prabhakar | N/A | |
| Shivanaga | "Mutthugala Ratnagala" | Rajan–Nagendra | Chi. Udayashankar | K. S. Chithra |
| Shivanaga | "Baaro Nanna" | Rajan–Nagendra | Chi. Udayashankar | K. S. Chithra |
| Shivanaga | "Manmatha Rathriyo" | Rajan–Nagendra | Chi. Udayashankar | K. S. Chithra |
| Sindhoora Thilaka | "Suggi Bandare" | Upendra Kumar | R. N. Jayagopal | solo |
| Sindhoora Thilaka | "Naa Seeti Hodidare" | Upendra Kumar | R. N. Jayagopal | solo |
| Sindhoora Thilaka | "Pancharangi Giniye" | Upendra Kumar | R. N. Jayagopal | solo |
| Sindhoora Thilaka | "Sobaana Haaduve" | Upendra Kumar | R. N. Jayagopal | solo |
| Solillada Sardara | "Kaveramma Kapadamma" | Hamsalekha | Hamsalekha | solo |
| Solillada Sardara | "Ee Kannada Mannanu" | Hamsalekha | Hamsalekha | solo |
| Solillada Sardara | "Jogayya Jogayya" | Hamsalekha | Hamsalekha | K. S. Chithra |
| Soori | "Khaaki Bante Maavayya" | Raj–Koti | N/A | Manjula Gururaj |
| Soori | "Hero Maro Bannor" | Raj–Koti | N/A | Manjula Gururaj |
| Soori | "Maharaaya Bande Neenu" | Raj–Koti | N/A | Manjula Gururaj |
| Soori | "Hai Bhaja Govinda" | Raj–Koti | N/A | Manjula Gururaj |
| Sriramachandra | "Enaayitu Nanageedina" | Hamsalekha | Hamsalekha | K. S. Chithra |
| Sriramachandra | "Bhootavilla Pishachiyilla" | Hamsalekha | Hamsalekha | Mano |
| Sriramachandra | "Sundari Sundari" | Hamsalekha | Hamsalekha | solo |
| Undu Hoda Kondu Hoda | "Lolalotte Ee Baduku" | Vijaya Bhaskar | Nagathihalli Chandrashekar | solo |
| Vajrayudha | "Tooru Tooru | Hamsalekha | Hamsalekha | K. S. Chithra |
| Vajrayudha | "Collegina Kanasina Rani" | Hamsalekha | Hamsalekha | Latha Hamsalekha |

=== 1993 ===
| Film | Song | Composer(s) | Writer(s) | Co-singer(s) |
|---|---|---|---|---|
| Ananda Jyothi | "O Priyathama" | Vijayanand | Chi. Udaya Shankar | K. S. Chithra |
| Ananda Jyothi | "Eno Hosathana" | Vijayanand | Chi. Udaya Shankar | K. S. Chithra |
| Ananda Jyothi | "Honnantha Naadu" | Vijayanand | Chi. Udaya Shankar | solo |
| Ananda Jyothi | "Kannige Kaanuva" | Vijayanand | Chi. Udaya Shankar | solo |
| Annayya | "Ahaa Ohoo" | Hamsalekha | | K. S. Chithra |
| Annayya | "Come on Darling Ayyo Ayyo" | Hamsalekha | | K. S. Chithra |
| Annayya | "Ragi Holadage Khali" | Hamsalekha | | K. S. Chithra |
| Annayya | "Bombe Bombe" | Hamsalekha | | S. Janaki |
| Annayya | "Ammayya Ammayya" | Hamsalekha | | solo |
| Gadibidi Ganda | "Neenu Neene" "Gadibidi Ganda Neenu" "Bidde Bidde" "Pancharangi Putta" | Hamsalekha | Hamsalekha | K. S. Chithra |
| Rayaru Bandaru Mavana Manege | "Baare Baare Deviye" "Adavi Deviya Kadu Janagala" "Muddina Hudugi Chanda" "Aparadhi Naanalla Aparadha Enagilla" | Raj–Koti | R. N. Jayagopal; M. N. Vyasa Rao | K. S. Chitra |
| Kalyana Rekhe | "Kalyana Rekhe" | Hamsalekha | Hamsalekha | Manjula Gururaj |
| Kalyana Rekhe | "O Chaitra Nee" | Hamsalekha | Hamsalekha | Manjula Gururaj |
| Kalyana Rekhe | "Oh Maina Oh Sakhi" | Hamsalekha | Hamsalekha | Manjula Gururaj |
| Kalyana Rekhe | "Dayamadi Mannisu" | Hamsalekha | Hamsalekha | solo |
| Mangalya Bandhana | "Jeeva Nanna" | Hamsalekha | Hamsalekha | K. S. Chithra |
| Mangalya Bandhana | "Bisilaadarenu" | Hamsalekha | Hamsalekha | K. S. Chithra |
| Mangalya Bandhana | "Baalu Needalaagadavanu" | Hamsalekha | Hamsalekha | K. S. Chithra |
| Mane Devru | "Neene Nanna Neene Nanna" | Hamsalekha | Hamsalekha | S. Janaki |
| Mane Devru | "Thappu Madodu Sahaja Kano" | Hamsalekha | Hamsalekha | S. Janaki |
| Mane Devru | "Sundari Sundari" | Hamsalekha | Hamsalekha | S. Janaki |
| Mane Devru | "Arambha Premadaramba" | Hamsalekha | Hamsalekha | K. S. Chithra |
| Mane Devru | "Jeevan Eru Perina" | Hamsalekha | Hamsalekha | solo |
| Muddina Maava | "Aaradhane" | S. P. Balasubrahmanyam | Hamsalekha | K. S. Chithra |
| Muddina Maava | "Varane Maduve Maduve" | S. P. Balasubrahmanyam | Hamsalekha | K. S. Chithra |
| Muddina Maava | "Deepavali Deepavali" | S. P. Balasubrahmanyam | Hamsalekha | Dr. Rajkumar, Manjula Gururaj |

=== 1994 ===
| Film | Song | Composer(s) | Writer(s) | Co-singer(s) |
|---|---|---|---|---|
| Beladingala Baale | "Gopala Kelo" | Guna Singh | Shamasundara Kulkarni | Vani Jairam |
| Beladingala Baale | "Baraseleda Olave" | Guna Singh | Doddarange Gowda | Vani Jairam |
| Beladingala Baale | "Neen Yaaro Naa Ariye" | Guna Singh | Doddarange Gowda | solo |
| Jeevanadhi | "Kannada Nadina Jeevanadi" "Ee Andada" | Koti | R. N. Jayagopal | Anuradha Paudwal |
| Keralida Sarpa | "Hrudaya Meetidaga" | Sangeetha Raja | N/A | Vani Jairam |
| Keralida Sarpa | "Nagu Nathuga Aaduva" | Sangeetha Raja | N/A | Vani Jairam |
| Keralida Sarpa | "Asenota Koodi" | Sangeetha Raja | N/A | Vani Jairam |
| Keralida Sarpa | "Sanje Kavidaaga" | Sangeetha Raja | N/A | Manjula Gururaj |
| Kunthi Puthra | "Ee Prema" | Vijayanand | N/A | K. S. Chithra |
| Kunthi Puthra | "Ee Prema Patho" | Vijayanand | N/A | K. S. Chithra |
| Kunthi Puthra | "Nammura Siridevi" | Vijayanand | N/A | K. S. Chithra |
| Kunthi Puthra | "Pappi Kode" | Vijayanand | N/A | K. S. Chithra |
| Kunthi Puthra | "Amma Yennalu" | Vijayanand | N/A | solo |
| Rasika | "Thananam Thananam" | Hamsalekha | Hamsalekha | K. S. Chithra |
| Rasika | "Baare Hogona Preethi Madona" | Hamsalekha | Hamsalekha | K. S. Chithra |
| Rasika | "Ambaraveri Ambaraveri" | Hamsalekha | Hamsalekha | solo |
| Rasika | "Haadondu Haadabeku" | Hamsalekha | Hamsalekha | solo |
| Rasika | "Chitapata Chitapata" | Hamsalekha | Hamsalekha | S. Janaki |
| Rasika | "Yavvo Yaako Maige" | Hamsalekha | Hamsalekha | S. Janaki |

=== 1995 ===
| Film | Song | Composer(s) | Writer(s) | Co-singer(s) |
|---|---|---|---|---|
| Aata Hudugata | "Aa Belli Chukki Namma" | Sadhu Kokila | N/A | K. S. Chithra |
| Aata Hudugata | "O Premave Nee" | Sadhu Kokila | N/A | solo |
| Aata Hudugata | "Ullasada Ee Sanjegee" | Sadhu Kokila | N/A | solo |
| Aata Hudugata | "Mutthu Ondu Mutthu" | Sadhu Kokila | N/A | chorus |
| Anuraga Sangama | "Thavare O Thavare" | V. Manohar | V. Manohar | Sudharani |
| Anuraga Sangama | "Sangama Sangama" | V. Manohar | V. Manohar | Chandrika Gururaj |
| Anuraga Sangama | "O Bandhuve" | V. Manohar | V. Manohar | Chandrika Gururaj |
| Anuraga Sangama | "Diya Diya Do" | V. Manohar | V. Manohar | Master Chetan, Master Rajesh |
| Aragini | "Kusumavu Neenu" | S. P. Venkatesh | Hamsalekha | K. S. Chithra |
| Aragini | "Kannamucche Aadaitho" | S. P. Venkatesh | Hamsalekha | K. S. Chithra |
| Baalondu Chaduranga | "Manmathana Simhasanakke" | Seenu | N/A | K. S. Chithra |
| Baalondu Chaduranga | "Baala Jyothiyagi" | Seenu | N/A | |
| Baalondu Chaduranga | "Savi Jeninanthe" | Seenu | N/A | |
| Baalondu Chaduranga | "Ananda Mahadananda | Seenu | N/A | Rajesh Krishnan, Manjula Gururaj |
| Baalondu Chaduranga | "Mohabattu Bandaga" | Seenu | N/A | solo |
| Baalondu Chaduranga | "Munjane Manjalli" | Seenu | N/A | Manjula Gururaj |
| Bal Nan Maga | "Olave Olave" | Sadhu Kokila | Sriranga | K. S. Chithra |
| Bal Nan Maga | "O Nanna Raja" | Sadhu Kokila | Sriranga | K. S. Chithra |
| Bangarada Kalasha | "Entha Hennannu Kande" | Rajan–Nagendra | Chi. Udaya Shankar | K. S. Chithra |
| Bangarada Kalasha | "Nagu Nagutho Naliyo" | Rajan–Nagendra | Chi. Udaya Shankar | K. S. Chithra |
| Bangarada Kalasha | "Nammoora Kerigalalli" | Rajan–Nagendra | Chi. Udaya Shankar | K. S. Chithra |
| Bangarada Kalasha | "Sihimuthu Sihimuthu" | Rajan–Nagendra | Chi. Udaya Shankar | K. S. Chithra |
| Bangarada Kalasha | "Samsaaravendare" | Rajan–Nagendra | Chi. Udaya Shankar | Sangeetha Katti, Manjula Gururaj |
| Bangarada Kalasha | "Aha Anno Kelasa" | Rajan–Nagendra | Chi. Udaya Shankar | solo |
| Beladingala Baale | "Gopala Kelo" | Guna Singh | Shamasundara Kulkarni | Vani Jairam |
| Beladingala Baale | "Baraseleda Olave" | Guna Singh | Doddarangegowda | Vani Jairam |
| Beladingala Baale | "Neen Yaaro Naa Ariye" | Guna Singh | Doddarangegowda | solo |
| Bombat Raja Bandal Rani | "Hrudaya Prema Nilaya" | Raj Mohan | Sri Raaga | K. S. Chithra |
| Bombat Raja Bandal Rani | "Suggi Bandaithe" | Raj Mohan | Sri Raaga | chorus |
| Bombat Raja Bandal Rani | "Katthari Haako" | Raj Mohan | Sri Raaga | Manjula Gururaj |
| Bombat Raja Bandal Rani | "Minchuganna Sanchugaathi" | Raj Mohan | Sri Raaga | Manjula Gururaj |
| Bombat Raja Bandal Rani | "Doddavarenisidha" | Raj Mohan | Sri Raaga | solo |
| Chiranjeevi Rajegowda | "Hareyave Hareyave" | Hamsalekha | Hamsalekha | K. S. Chithra |
| Chiranjeevi Rajegowda | "Amma Amma Dayabaradenu" | Hamsalekha | Hamsalekha | K. S. Chithra |
| Dheerga Sumangali | "Kaviya Samaya" | Hamsalekha | Hamsalekha | S. Janaki |
| Dheerga Sumangali | "Chandra Manchake" | Hamsalekha | Hamsalekha | K. S. Chithra |
| Dheerga Sumangali | "Thavarondu Chinthe" | HAmsalekha | Hamsalekha | solo |
| Dore | "Halli Haadu Thanadanana" | Hamsalekha | Hamsalekha | K. S. Chithra |
| Dore | "Laaliya Thumba" | Hamsalekha | Hamsalekha | K. S. Chithra |
| Emergency | "Ananda Thumbida" | Sadhu Kokila | Sriranga | K. S. Chithra |
| Eshwar | "Naanu Mecchida" | Hamsalekha | Hamsalekha | K. S. Chithra |
| Eshwar | "Chenchala Chenchala" | Hamsalekha | Hamsalekha | K. S. Chithra |
| Eshwar | "Chinnadantha Kai Idu" | Hamsalekha | Hamsalekha | solo |
| Eshwar | "My Name Is Eshwar" | Hamsalekha | Hamsalekha | solo |
| Eshwar | "Cementina Seemayalli" | Hamsalekha | Hamsalekha | Latha Hamsalekha |
| Gadibidi Aliya | "Ladyge Gentlemanu" | Koti | R. N. Jayagopal | K. S. Chithra |
| Gadibidi Aliya | "Jhamma Jhamma" | Koti | R. N. Jayagopal | K. S. Chithra |
| Gadibidi Aliya | "Havana Havana" | Koti | R. N. Jayagopal | solo |
| Gadibidi Aliya | "Rama Rasave" | Koti | R. N. Jayagopal | Manjula Gururaj |
| Ganeshana Galate | "Bhagyada Lakshmi Bandaaythu" | Rajan–Nagendra | N/A | S. Janaki |
| Ganeshana Galate | "Don'T Worry Chinna" | Rajan–Nagendra | solo | |
| Ganeshana Galate | "Preethiya Selethave" | Rajan–Nagendra | solo | |
| Giddu Dada | "Chinna Ninna" | Rajan–Nagendra | Chi. Udayashankar | K. S. Chithra |
| Giddu Dada | "Nee Thumbi Ninthe" | Rajan–Nagendra | Chi. Udayashankar | K. S. Chithra |
| Hello Sister | "Premakke Crazy" | Koti | N/A | Manjula Gururaj |
| Hello Sister | "Maama Matashu" | Koti | N/A | Manjula Gururaj |
| Hello Sister | "Hello Sister" | Koti | N/A | Rajesh Krishnan, Manjula Gururaj |
| Hello Sister | "Modala Raathri Mutthu" | Koti | N/A | Sangeetha Katti |
| Himapatha | "O Sundare Vasundhare" | Hamsalekha | Hamsalekha | K. S. Chithra |
| Himapatha | "Thereyo Manjina Thereya" | Hamsalekha | Hamsalekha | K. S. Chithra |
| Himapatha | "Ee Kanchana Ganga" | Hamsalekha | Hamsalekha | S. Janaki |
| Hosa Baduku | "Prema Emba" | Vijaya Bhaskar | R. N. Jayagopal | K. S. Chithra |
| Hosa Baduku | "Jeevana Endigu" | Vijaya Bhaskar | R. N. Jayagopal | K. S. Chithra |
| Kalyanotsava | "Biliya Bannada Maiyya" | Hamsalekha | Hamsalekha | K. S. Chithra |
| Kalyanotsava | "Preethi Maaro Hudugara" | Hamsalekha | Hamsalekha | Manjula Gururaj |
| Kalyanotsava | "Bannada Chitteya" | Hamsalekha | Hamsalekha | Manjula Gururaj |
| Kalyanotsava | "Aaha Biriyani" | Hamsalekha | Hamsalekha | solo |
| Kalyanotsava | "Itthu Ondu Kaala" | Hamsalekha | Hamsalekha | solo |
| Killer Diary | "Kele Kusumave" | Vijayanand | | solo |
| Killer Diary | "Bharatambe" | Vijayanand | | solo |
| Killer Diary | "Haalu Kodu" | Vijayanand | | Rajesh |
| Kona Edaithe | "Gattina Nindu Heartu" | Hamsalekha | Hamsalekha | solo |
| Kona Edaithe | "Baa Seeti Hodi" | Hamsalekha | Hamsalekha | solo |
| Mr. Vasu | "Rukku Bandalu Rukku" | Hamsalekha | Hamsalekha | K. S. Chithra |
| Mr. Vasu | "Cheluvayya" | Hamsalekha | Hamsalekha | K. S. Chithra |
| Mr. Vasu | "Rangeela Rangeela" | Hamsalekha | Hamsalekha | K. S. Chithra |
| Mruthyu Bandhana | "Ee Hrudaya Aasege" | Peter J. Kamilose | Sri Chandra | K. S. Chithra |
| Naviloora Naidile | "Kshamisu Nanna" | Hamsalekha | Hamsalekha | K. S. Chithra |
| Naviloora Naidile | "Banniro Janare" | Hamsalekha | Hamsalekha | K. S. Chithra |
| Nilukada Nakshatra | "Nanna Ninna" | Sangeetha Raja | Doddarange Gowda | K. S. Chithra |
| Nilukada Nakshatra | "Varusha Thumbidare" | Sangeetha Raja | Doddarange Gowda | K. S. Chithra |
| Nilukada Nakshatra | "Anda Chenda" | Sangeetha Raja | Doddarange Gowda | K. S. Chithra |
| Nilukada Nakshatra | "Banalli Haraaduva" | Sangeetha Raja | Doddarange Gowda | K. S. Chithra |
| Nilukada Nakshatra | "Banniro Jaanare" | Sangeetha Raja | Doddarange Gowda | K. S. Chithra |
| Putmalli | "Bhoomi Suryanige" | Seenu | Sriranga | K. S. Chithra |
| Putmalli | "Onde Ondu Haadu" | Seenu | Sriranga | K. S. Chithra |
| Ravitheja | "Preethi Kogile" | Sax Raja | K. Kalyan | K. S. Chithra |
| Ravitheja | "Chaitra Neenu" | Sax Raja | K. Kalyan | K. S. Chithra |
| Rowdy | "O Sundara O Chandira" | Raj–Koti | R. N. Jayagopal | K. S. Chithra |
| Rowdy | "Prema Erade Aksharavu" | Raj–Koti | R. N. Jayagopal | K. S. Chithra |
| Samara | "Mai Marethu" | Kousthuba | Hamsalekha | K. S. Chithra |
| Samara | "Aa Aaa E Ee" | Kousthuba | Hamsalekha | K. S. Chithra |
| Samara | "Kanasinalu Neene" | Kousthuba | Hamsalekha | K. S. Chithra |
| Sangeetha Sagara Ganayogi Panchakshara Gavai | "Nodalaagade" | Hamsalekha | Nijaguna Shivayogi | solo |
| Sangeetha Sagara Ganayogi Panchakshara Gavai | "Umandu Ghamandu" | Hamsalekha | Tansen | solo |
| Sangeetha Sagara Ganayogi Panchakshara Gavai | "Gaanavidya Badi | Hamsalekha | Tansen | L. N. Shastry |
| Sathya Jwale | "Chaitra Chaitra" | Hamsalekha | Hamsalekha | K. S. Chithra |
| Sathya Jwale | "Kudidaaga Kulavonde" | Hamsalekha | Hamsalekha | K. S. Chithra |
| Sathya Jwale | "Nangoonu Modalu" | Hamsalekha | Hamsalekha | K. S. Chithra |
| Savya Sachi | "Chengulabi Thotadalli" | Sadhu Kokila | Sriranga | K. S. Chithra |
| Savya Sachi | "Namma Madhuchandra" | Sadhu Kokila | Sriranga | K. S. Chithra |
| Savya Sachi | "Raja Rani Navilolake" | Sadhu Kokila | Hamsalekha | K. S. Chithra |
| Savya Sachi | "Nagara Haave" | Sadhu Kokila | Hamsalekha | K. S. Chithra, Rajesh Krishnan, Mangala |
| State Rowdy | "Jummare Jumma" | Rajan–Nagendra | V. Manohar | K. S. Chithra |
| State Rowdy | "Nanna Seledu" | Rajan–Nagendra | V. Manohar | K. S. Chithra |
| Thavaru Beegaru | "Chaitrada Hunnimeye" | Sadhu Kokila | Doddarange Gowda | K. S. Chithra |
| Thavaru Beegaru | "O Gelathi Baare" | Sadhu Kokila | Doddarange Gowda | K. S. Chithra |
| Thumbida Mane | "Hatthira Hatthira | Upendra Kumar | M. D. Hashim | Manjula Gururaj |
| Thumbida Mane | "Phalisithu Premada" | Upendra Kumar | M. D. Hashim | Manjula Gururaj |
| Thumbida Mane | "Jeevakke Jeeva" | Upendra Kumar | M. D. Hashim | Sangeetha Katti |
| Thumbida Mane | "Kaveri Sirigannada" | Upendra Kumar | M. D. Hashim | solo |
| Thungabhadra | "Jhum Jhum" | Hamsalekha | Hamsalekha | K. S. Chithra |
| Thungabhadra | "Oh Maava Oh Maava" | Hamsalekha | Hamsalekha | K. S. Chithra |
| Thungabhadra | "Belli Bettadalli" | Hamsalekha | Hamsalekha | K. S. Chithra |
| Thungabhadra | "Sagariye Hogariye" | Hamsalekha | Hamsalekha | K. S. Chithra |
| Yama Kinkara | "Heli Kodu Baa" | Rajan–Nagendra | N/A | K. S. Chithra |
| Yama Kinkara | "O Miss India" | Rajan–Nagendra | N/A | K. S. Chithra |
| Yama Kinkara | "Oho Ho Daali" | Rajan–Nagendra | N/A | K. S. Chithra |

=== 1996 ===
| Film | Song | Composer(s) | Writer(s) | Co-singer(s) |
|---|---|---|---|---|
| Annavra Makkalu | "Oh Jaana Neene Nanna" | Rajesh Ramanath | N/A | Swarnalatha |
| Annavra Makkalu | "Annavra Makkalu Naavu" | Rajesh Ramanath | N/A | Rajesh Krishnan |
| Halunda Thavaru | Ele Hombisile, Olavina Runava, Ee Dharege | Hamsalekha | | K. S. Chithra |
| Mahakshathriya | Ee Bhoomi Bannada Buguri | Hamsalekha | | |
| Nammoora Mandara Hoove | "Manadaase Hakkiyaagi" | Ilaiyaraaja | Doddarangegowda | Manjula Gururaj |
| Nammoora Mandara Hoove | "Halli Lavaniyalli Laali" | Ilaiyaraaja | K. Kalyan | Chithra |
| Nammoora Mandara Hoove | "Mutthu Mutthu Neera Haniya" | Ilaiyaraaja | K. Kalyan | Chithra |
| Nammoora Mandara Hoove | "Dheem Thakita" | Ilaiyaraaja | V. Manohar | solo |
| Sipayi | Hey Rukkamma, Snehakke Sneha, Kokko Koliye | Hamsalekha | | |
| Thavarina Thottilu | "Arishina Kuttiravva" | Rajesh Ramanath | S. Narayan | Gururaj Hoskote |
| Thavarina Thottilu | "Malenadina Minchina Balli" | Rajesh Ramanath | S. Narayan | K. S. Chithra |
| Thavarina Thottilu | "O Bombeye Dalimbeye" | Rajesh Ramanath | S. Narayan | K. S. Chithra |
| Thavarina Thottilu | "Brahma Bareda Haaleyalli" | Rajesh Ramanath | S. Narayan | solo |

=== 1997 ===
| Film | Song | Composer(s) | Writer(s) | Co-singer(s) |
|---|---|---|---|---|
| Amruthavarshini | "Ee Sundara", "Bhale Bhale Chandada", "Kannina Notagalu", "Manase Baduku" | Deva | | K. S. Chithra |
| Kalavida | "Oh Navile", "Andagara Alimayya" | Hamsalekha | | K. S. Chithra, Swarnalatha |
| Muddina Kanmani | "Endendu Ninnanu Marethu | S. P. Venkatesh | Geethapriya | K. S. Chithra |
| Muddina Kanmani | "Modalane Rathriyali" | S. P. Venkatesh | Doddarange Gowda | K. S. Chithra |
| Muddina Kanmani | "Manasu Navilinanthe" | S. P. Venkatesh | Doddarange Gowda | K. S. Chithra |
| Muddina Kanmani | "Siribhoomi Neenagi" | S. P. Venkatesh | Doddarange Gowda | K. S. Chithra |
| Muddina Kanmani | "Nanna Chinna" | S. P. Venkatesh | Geethapriya | Prabhakar |
| O Mallige | "Muddada Baale", "Giri Siri Nela Hola" | V.Manohar | | |

=== 1998 ===
| Film | Song | Composer(s) | Writer(s) | Co-singer(s) |
|---|---|---|---|---|
| A | "Maari Kannu" | Gurukiran | Upendra | |
| Gadibidi Krishna | "Taka Taka Takaisu" | Hamsalekha | Hamsalekha | Sowmya Raoh |
| Gadibidi Krishna | "Raadha Raadha" | Hamsalekha | Hamsalekha | Sowmya Raoh |
| Gadibidi Krishna | "Ene Idu" | Hamsalekha | Hamsalekha | Latha Hamsalekha |

=== 1999 ===
| Film | Song | Composer(s) | Writer(s) | Co-singer(s) |
|---|---|---|---|---|
| Surya Vamsha | "Sevanthiye " | V. Manohar | | |
| Surya Vamsha | "Pancharangi" | V. Manohar | | |
| Chandramukhi Pranasakhi | "Nenapugala Maathu Madhura" | K. Kalyan | K. Kalyan | K. S. Chithra |
| Chandramukhi Pranasakhi | "Aralo Hunnime" | K. Kalyan | K. Kalyan | |
| Chandramukhi Pranasakhi | "Modala Prema Patrave" | K. Kalyan | K. Kalyan | K. S. Chithra |
| Chandramukhi Pranasakhi | "Ondu Prema Pallakkiya Mele" | K. Kalyan | K. Kalyan | K. S. Chithra |
| Veerappa Nayaka | "Bharathambe Ninna Janumadina" | Rajesh Ramanath | | |
| Veerappa Nayaka | "Ee Mannina Hemmeya Maganivanu" | Rajesh Ramanath | | |
| Veerappa Nayaka | "Malle Ninna Maathu Kelada" | Rajesh Ramanath | | K. S. Chithra |
| Veerappa Nayaka | "O Ambarave Ninnede" | Rajesh Ramanath | | |
| Veerappa Nayaka | "Jeeva Jyothiye" | Rajesh Ramanath | | |

== 2000s ==
=== 2000 ===
| Film | Song | Composer(s) | Writer(s) | Co-singer(s) |
|---|---|---|---|---|
| Deepavali | "Mukkoti Suryaniva" | M. M. Keeravani | K. Kalyan | K. S. Chithra |
| Deepavali | "Harusha Devige" | M. M. Keeravani | M N Vyasa Rao | |
| Deepavali | "Shruti Layada Jothe" | M. M. Keeravani | Rudresh Nagasandra | |
| Devara Maga | "Bendakaloora Pakka" | Hamsalekha | Hamsalekha | K. S. Chithra |
| Devara Maga | "Gowdaji Gowdaji" | Hamsalekha | Hamsalekha | K. S. Chithra |
| Devara Maga | "Ye Belle Gowda Yedda" | Hamsalekha | Hamsalekha | K. S. Chithra |
| Galate Aliyandru | "Saiyaare Hoye" | Deva | S. Narayan | K. S. Chithra |
| Galate Aliyandru | "Sagariye Sagariye" | Deva | K. Kalyan | K. S. Chithra |
| Hagalu Vesha | "Sadaarame Sadaarame" | Hamsalekha | Baraguru Ramachandrappa | |
| Krishna Leele | "Krishna Nee Begane Baaro" | V. Manohar | V. Manohar | |
| Mahathma | "Ee Bhoomili" | V Ravichandran | K. Kalyan | Suma Sastry |
| Mahathma | "I Love You" | V Ravichandran | K. Kalyan | Anuradha Sriram |
| Naga Devathe | "Murali Ravali" | Hamsalekha | Hamsalekha | K. S. Chithra |
| Nannavalu Nannavalu | "Hoovennale" | Prashanth Raj | K. Kalyan | |
| O Nanna Nalle | "Kanasugarana"(Female) | V Ravichandran | V Ravichandran | |
| O Nanna Nalle | "O Nanna Nalle" | V Ravichandran | V Ravichandran | |
| O Nanna Nalle | "Ee Preethige Kannu Illa" | V Ravichandran | V Ravichandran | Suma Sastry |
| O Nanna Nalle | "Rangu Rangena Halli" | V Ravichandran | V Ravichandran | K. S. Chithra |
| O Nanna Nalle | "Kanasalu" | V Ravichandran | V Ravichandran | |
| Preethse | "Holi Holi" | Hamsalekha | Hamsalekha | K. S. Chithra, Rajesh, Anuradha Paudwal |
| Preethsu Thappenilla | "Hehe Oho" | V Ravichandran | V Ravichandran | Ramesh, LN Sastri, Suma |
| Preethsu Thappenilla | "I Love You Feeling" | V Ravichandran | V Ravichandran | Malgudi Subha |
| Preethsu Thappenilla | "Oh Nannavalu Green Signal" | V Ravichandran | V Ravichandran | Suma Sastry |
| Shabdavedhi | "Baaro Baaro Sri Krishna" | Hamsalekha | Hamsalekha | |
| Shrirasthu Shubhamasthu | "Punaha Punaha Kelidaru" | K. Kalyan | K. Kalyan | K. S. Chithra |
| Shrirasthu Shubhamasthu | "Belli Bettada Mele" | K. Kalyan | K. Kalyan | K. S. Chithra |
| Shrirasthu Shubhamasthu | "Bhoodevi Netthi Mele" | K. Kalyan | K. Kalyan | K. S. Chithra |
| Shrirasthu Shubhamasthu | "Sagaradalli" | K. Kalyan | K. Kalyan | K. S. Chithra |
| Soorappa | "Ee Mannige Naa" | Hamsalekha | Hamsalekha | |
| Soorappa | "Sooryanobbane" | Hamsalekha | Hamsalekha | |
| Yare Nee Abhimani | "Mysore Seeme" | Hamsalekha | Hamsalekha | |
| Yare Nee Abhimani | "Shrungarada Kavyavo" | Hamsalekha | Hamsalekha | Rathnamala Prakash |
| Yajamana | "Namma Maneyalli" | Rajesh Ramanath | K. Kalyan | K. S. Chithra, Rajesh |
| Yajamana | "Prema Chandrama" | Rajesh Ramanath | K. Kalyan | |

=== 2001 ===
| Film | Song | Composer(s) | Writer(s) | Co-singer(s) |
|---|---|---|---|---|
| Amma | "Munjane Gaganada" | M. M. Keeravani | R. N. Jayagopal | K. S. Chithra |
| Amma | "Shrustikartha" | M. M. Keeravani | R. N. Jayagopal | |
| Amma | "Idhu Charitheyu" | M. M. Keeravani | R. N. Jayagopal | |
| Anjali Geethanjali | "Suianno Sampadagaali | Prashanth Raj | S. Narayan | |
| Anjali Geethanjali | "O Chandamama" | Prashanth Raj | S. Narayan | K. S. Chithra |
| Banallu Neene Buviyallu Neene | "Chaluve Baanallu" (Duet) | Prashanth Raj | S. Narayan | K. S. Chithra |
| Banallu Neene Buviyallu Neene | "Chaluve Baanallu"(Male) | Prashanth Raj | S. Narayan | |
| Baava Baamaida | "Onti Ontiyagiruvudu" | Hamsalekha | Hamsalekha | K. S. Chithra |
| Baava Baamaida | "Yavvi Yavvi Yavvi" | Hamsalekha | Hamsalekha | Kavita Krishnamurti |
| Chitra | "Love Geethanjali" | Gurukiran | K. Kalyan | |
| Chitra | "Punjabnalli Tension" | Gurukiran | K. Kalyan | Murali Mohan |
| Diggajaru | "Humba Humba" | Hamsalekha | Hamsalekha | |
| Diggajaru | "Nandi Bettana Banner" | Hamsalekha | Hamsalekha | Anuradha Sriram |
| Diggajaru | "Komale Komale" | Hamsalekha | Hamsalekha | Anuradha Sriram |
| Diggajaru | "Kichuku Kichuku" | Hamsalekha | Hamsalekha | |
| Diggajaru | "Kichuku Kichuku"(Sad) | Hamsalekha | Hamsalekha | |
| Grama Devathe | "Gangama Gowramma" | Dhina | Sriranga | Swarnalatha |
| Hoo Anthiya Uhoo Anthiya | "Kanasugala" | Karthik Raja | M N Vyasa Rao | |
| Jodi | "Gentleman" | S. A. Rajkumar | R. N. Jayagopal | Devan |
| Jodi | "Darling Darling" | S. A. Rajkumar | R. N. Jayagopal | Devan |
| Jodi | "O Preethiye" | S. A. Rajkumar | R. N. Jayagopal | K. S. Chithra |
| Kanasugara | "Chitte Banthu Chitte" | Rajesh Ramanath | K. Kalyan | |
| Kanasugara | "Kamana Bille" | Rajesh Ramanath | K. Kalyan | K. S. Chithra |
| Kanasugara | "Suryana Gelethanake" | Rajesh Ramanath | K. Kalyan | K. S. Chithra |
| Kanasugara | "Ello Adu Ello"(Male) | Rajesh Ramanath | K. Kalyan | |
| Kanasugara | "Om Namaha" | Rajesh Ramanath | K. Kalyan | Manjula Gururaj |
| Kotigobba | "Annayya Tammayya" | Deva | K. Kalyan | |
| Kotigobba | "Are Tai Tai Tandana" | Deva | K. Kalyan | |
| Kotigobba | "Kaverige Kalungara" | Deva | K. Kalyan | K. S. Chithra |
| Kotigobba | "Sahasa Simha" | Deva | K. Kalyan | |
| Kotigobba | "Tingala Belakina" | Deva | K. Kalyan | K. S. Chithra |
| Kotigobba | "Vardhana Vishnuvardana" | Deva | K. Kalyan | K. S. Chithra |
| Maduve Aagona Baa | "America Baby" | Koti, M. M. Keeravani | K. Kalyan | Swarnalatha |
| Maduve Aagona Baa | "A B C D Vayasu" | Koti, M. M. Keeravani | K. Kalyan | M. M. Srilekha |
| Maduve Aagona Baa | "Chilaka Paapa" | Koti, M. M. Keeravani | K. Kalyan | K. S. Chithra |
| Maduve Aagona Baa | "Hogaya Mein" | Koti, M. M. Keeravani | K. Kalyan | K. S. Chithra |
| Premakke Sai | "Chammak Chammak" | Hamsalekha | K. Kalyan | Mahalakshmi Iyer |
| Premakke Sai | "Santhosha Sambhrama" | Hamsalekha | K. Kalyan | |
| Premakke Sai | "Munjane Mussanje" | Hamsalekha | K. Kalyan | |
| Premi No 1 | "Naa Haaduva" | Gurukiran | K. Kalyan | |
| Shivappa Nayaka | "Beeso Gaali Onde" | Dhina | Doddarange Gowda | Chandrika Gururaj |
| Sri Manjunatha | "Yavon Kanda Ninna" | Hamsalekha | Hamsalekha | K. S. Chithra |
| Sri Manjunatha | "Sri Manjunatha" | Hamsalekha | Hamsalekha | K. S. Chithra |
| Sri Manjunatha | "Ee Paadha Punya Pada" | Hamsalekha | Hamsalekha | |
| Sri Manjunatha | "Jogappa Jogamma" | Hamsalekha | Hamsalekha | K. S. Chithra |
| Sri Manjunatha | "Thanuvina Manege" | Hamsalekha | Hamsalekha | |
| Sri Manjunatha | "Ananda Paramananda" | Hamsalekha | Hamsalekha | K. S. Chithra |
| Sri Manjunatha | "Obbane Obbane" | Hamsalekha | Hamsalekha | |
| Sundara Kanda | "Kukku Kukku Hennige" | M. M. Keeravani | K. Kalyan | Nanditha |
| Sundara Kanda | "Are Jumma Jummalaka" | M. M. Keeravani | K. Kalyan | Harini |
| Usire | "Muthu Helo Maathidu" | Ilaiyaraaja | K. Kalyan | |
| Usire | "Janapada Annodu" | Ilaiyaraaja | K. Kalyan | K. S. Chithra |
| Vishalakshammana Guddi | "Kirana Kirana" | Prashanth Raj | | K. S. Chithra |
| Vande Matharam | "Hindusthana Gottheno" | Deva | Hamsalekha | K. S. Chithra |
| Yarige Beda Duddu | "Chellidalu Chellidalu" | M N Krupakar | M N Krupakar | |
| Yuvaraja | "Chandana Siri" | Ramana Gogula | K. Kalyan | |

=== 2002 ===
| Film | Song | Composer(s) | Writer(s) | Co-singer(s) |
|---|---|---|---|---|
| Annayya Thammayya | "Prema Hoo Baanave" | Prashanth Raj | S Umesh | Naditha |
| Balarama | "Onti Henna" | Hamsalekha | Hamsalekha | B. Jayashree |
| Cheluve Ondu Helthini | "Yedege Badiyithu" | Hamsalekha | Hamsalekha | |
| Cheluve Ondu Helthini | "Dum Dum Dum" | Hamsalekha | Hamsalekha | Vijay Aras, Nagachandrika |
| Dakota Express | "Bassu Bassu" | Hamsalekha | Hamsalekha | |
| Dakota Express | "O God O God" | Hamsalekha | Hamsalekha | |
| Dharma Devathe | "Baralide Ee Jagake" | Upendra Kumar | Nagendra Magadi | |
| Dharma Devathe | "Dharma Devathe" | Upendra Kumar | Geethapriya | |
| Ekangi | "Ondu Nimisha" | V Ravichandran | V Ravichandran | Anuradha Sriram |
| Hollywood | "Benkiyalli Haaku" | Gurukiran | Upendra | |
| Jamindaru | "Bettappa Bettappa" | M. M. Keeravani | S. Narayan | |
| Joot | "Neenu Avalaaga Bahudu" | Hamsalekha | Hamsalekha | |
| Joot | "Collegegu Thanks" | Hamsalekha | Hamsalekha | Latha Hamsalekha |
| Joot | "Nanna Sundara Kanasu" | Hamsalekha | Hamsalekha | K. S. Chithra |
| Kambala Halli | "Koli Koli" | Hamsalekha | Hamsalekha | |
| Kambala Halli | "Kambalahalli" | Hamsalekha | Hamsalekha | |
| Kodanda Rama | "Manaseldange Kelu" | V Ravichandran | V Ravichandran | L. N. Shastri |
| Manase O Manase | "Usheya Kirana Soki Soki" | V. Manohar | V. Manohar | Nanditha |
| Manase O Manase | "Sampige Kenda Sampige" | V. Manohar | V. Manohar | |
| Manase O Manase | "Theyya Theyya Thathayya" | V. Manohar | V. Manohar | Rithish |
| Manase O Manase | "Manase Manase" | V. Manohar | V. Manohar | |
| Mutthu | "Chandana Chandana" | Rajesh Ramanath | K. Kalyan | K. S. Chithra |
| Mutthu | "Koti Daiva Harisidarene" | Rajesh Ramanath | K. Kalyan | |
| Mutthu | "Ambara Amabaradaache" | Rajesh Ramanath | K. Kalyan | K. S. Chithra |
| Mutthu | "Koli Masale Saru" | Rajesh Ramanath | K. Kalyan | |
| Mutthu | "Ondu Hunnime Chandrana" | Rajesh Ramanath | K. Kalyan | K. S. Chithra |
| Naanu Naane | "Gelathiye" | Deva | V. Nagendra Prasad | Anuradha Sriram |
| Naanu Naane | "Neenaade"(Version l) | Deva | R. N. Jayagopal | Anuradha Sriram |
| Naanu Naane | "Oh Geleya" | Deva | R. N. Jayagopal | |
| Naanu Naane | "Kodagina Gandu" | Deva | V. Nagendra Prasad | |
| Naanu Naane | "Neenaade"(Version ll) | Deva | R. N. Jayagopal | Nanditha |
| Nagarahavu | "Haavina Dwesha" | Hamsalekha | Hamsalekha | |
| Nagarahavu | "Ammage Bitte" | Hamsalekha | Hamsalekha | |
| Parva | "Pallavi Thane Haadina" | Hamsalekha | Hamsalekha | K. S. Chithra |
| Parva | "Ee Parva Bhavasagara" | Hamsalekha | Hamsalekha | Mano, Divaya, Nanditha |
| Parva | "O Nanna Spoorthiye" | Hamsalekha | Hamsalekha | |
| Parva | "Sadhane Paramapada" | Hamsalekha | Hamsalekha | K. S. Chithra |
| Prema | "Ago Ago Kogile"(Male) | K. Kalyan | K. Kalyan | |
| Prema | "Yava Shilpi" | K. Kalyan | K. Kalyan | |
| Prema Khaidi | "Neenandre" | Prashanth Raj | Naganna | |
| Preethi Mado Hudugarigella | "Preethi Mado Hudugarigella" | Hamsalekha | Hamsalekha | |
| Preethi Mado Hudugarigella | "Kalyana Vagali" | Hamsalekha | Hamsalekha | Manjula Gururaj |
| Preethi Mado Hudugarigella | "Kodada Bidoda" | Hamsalekha | Hamsalekha | Manjula Gururaj |
| Preethi Mado Hudugarigella | "Ee Dina Nammadu" | Hamsalekha | Hamsalekha | Manjula Gururaj |
| Preethi Mado Hudugarigella | "Baane Bhoomige" | Hamsalekha | Hamsalekha | Manjula Gururaj |
| Preethi Mado Hudugarigella | "Priya Priya" | Hamsalekha | Hamsalekha | Manjula Gururaj |
| Preethi Mado Hudugarigella | "O Snehithare" | Hamsalekha | Hamsalekha | |
| Sainika | "Jai Hind Jai Hind" | Deva | Basha Ghulam | |
| Simhadriya Simha | "Barthanavva" | Deva | S. Narayan | K. S. Chithra, Rajesh, Sangeetha |
| Simhadriya Simha | "Kallaadare Naanu" | Deva | S. Narayan | |
| Simhadriya Simha | "Malnad Adike" | Deva | S. Narayan | Rajesh, Sangeetha |
| Simhadriya Simha | "Priya Priya" | Deva | S. Narayan | Chandrika Gururaj |
| Simhadriya Simha | "Simhadriya" | Deva | S. Narayan | |
| Simhadriya Simha | "Yajamaana" | Deva | S. Narayan | K. S. Chithra |
| Thavarige Baa Thangi | "Ravivarma Baaro" | Hamsalekha | Hamsalekha | K. S. Chithra |
| Thavarige Baa Thangi | "Ghali Ghali Ghalige" | Hamsalekha | Hamsalekha | Manjula Gururaj |
| Thuntata | "Yavudo Yavudo" | Gurukiran | K. Kalyan | |

=== 2003 ===
| Film | Song | Composer(s) | Writer(s) | Co-singer(s) |
|---|---|---|---|---|
| Annavru | "Kannadakkage Janana" | Rajesh Ramanath | K. Kalyan | |
| Badri | "Usire Preethi Usire" | Rajesh Ramanath | K. Kalyan | |
| Game For Love | "Amma Yavalo Ivalu" | Babji Sandeep | K. Kalyan | Anuradha Sriram |
| Game For Love | "Thayi Mamathe" | Babji Sandeep | K. Kalyan | |
| Gokarna | "Chakkar Haaku" | Gurukiran | Kaviraj, Upendra | Shamitha Malnad |
| Gokarna | "Brahma Ninge" | Gurukiran | G P Rajarathnam | |
| Heart Beats | "Chikubuku" | Venkat – Narayan | V. Nagendra Prasad | Anuradha Sriram |
| Heart Beats | "Yaare Nee Yaare" | Venkat – Narayan | V. Nagendra Prasad | |
| Hrudayavantha | "Anna Needore" | Hamsalekha | Hamsalekha | |
| Hrudayavantha | "Jhumu Jhumu" | Hamsalekha | Hamsalekha | K. S. Chithra |
| Hrudayavantha | "Thangiye Thangiye" | Hamsalekha | Hamsalekha | |
| Hrudayavantha | "Madhu Magalagi" | Hamsalekha | Hamsalekha | |
| Kariya | "Hrudayada Voltage" | Gurukiran | V. Nagendra Prasad | Kavita Krishnamurti |
| Katthegalu Saar Katthegalu | "Daga Donkey" | Hamsalekha | Hamsalekha | |
| Katthegalu Saar Katthegalu | "Jaya Jayahe" | Hamsalekha | Hamsalekha | |
| Nanjundi | "Kayuthalanno Namma" | Hamsalekha | Hamsalekha | |
| Ondagona Baa | "Ragi Mudde Murisi" | Hamsalekha | Hamsalekha | Anuradha Sriram |
| Ondagona Baa | "Ondagiddare Ella" | Hamsalekha | Hamsalekha | |
| Ondagona Baa | "Ajja Aalad Mara" | Hamsalekha | Hamsalekha | K. S. Chithra |
| Panchali | "Chandavalli" | Gurukiran | V. Nagendra Prasad | Sowmya |
| Raja Narasimha | "Priya Priya" | Deva | K. Kalyan | Sangeetha |
| Raja Narasimha | "Mandakki Thinnu" | Deva | K. Kalyan | Anuradha Sriram |
| Raja Narasimha | "Naane Naane" | Deva | K. Kalyan | |
| Raja Narasimha | "O Madhuvanthi" | Deva | K. Kalyan | Sujatha Mohan |
| Sacchi | "Rangu Rangina" | Gurukiran | V. Manohar | |
| Smile | "Kamala Mukha" | V. Manohar | V. Manohar | Nagachandrika |
| Smile | "Chile Chilepele" | V. Manohar | V. Manohar | K. S. Chithra |
| Smile | "Jagavidi Jagamaga" | V. Manohar | V. Manohar | Nanditha |
| Swathi Muthu | "Amma Dharma" | Rajesh Ramanath | V. Nagendra Prasad | K. S. Chithra |
| Thayi Illada Thabbali | "Kanne Bidada Kandanannu" | Hamsalekha | Hamsalekha | |
| Vijaya Dashami | "Dasara Banthamma" | Deva | R N Jayagopal | Swarnalatha, Vrunda |
| Vijaya Dashami | "Devi Shakthi Jagadamba" | Deva | R N Jayagopal | Vrunda |
| Vijaya Dashami | "Foreign Heccho" | Deva | Doddarange Gowda | Sujatha Mohan, Vrunda |
| Vijaya Dashami | "Kando Ninagoskara" | Deva | R N Jayagopal | |
| Vijaya Dashami | "Nanhasya" | Deva | K. Kalyan | Nanditha, Vrunda |
| Vijayasimha | "Ee Pyatege Benki" | Babji Sandeep | K. Kalyan | |
| Wrong Number | "Lakumi Lakumi" | V. Manohar | V. Manohar | Sangeetha |

=== 2004 ===
| Film | Song | Composer(s) | Writer(s) | Co-singer(s) |
|---|---|---|---|---|
| Apthamitra | "Anku Donku" | Gurukiran | V. Manohar | K. S. Chithra |
| Avale Nanna Gelathi | "Shubhashaya Shubhashaya" | Koti | | |
| Avale Nanna Gelathi | "Devare Ninna" | Koti | | Swarnalatha, Madhu Balakrishnan |
| Bidalare | "Kannada Kannada" | K M Indhra | K M Indhra | |
| Dharma | "Kavya Amrutha" | Hamsalekha | Hamsalekha | |
| Jyeshta | "Mannigu Manujanigu" | S. A. Rajkumar | K. Kalyan | |
| Kadamba | "Yamini Yaramna" | Deva | K. Kalyan | |
| Kadamba | "Sangathiye Kannalli" | Deva | K. Kalyan | |
| Kadamba | "Chukki Chukki" | Deva | K. Kalyan | |
| Kadamba | "Pancha Koti Kannadigare" | Deva | K. Kalyan | |
| Kanchana Ganga | "Prema Prema" | S. A. Rajkumar | R. N. Jayagopal | |
| Kanti | "Jinu Jinugo" | Gurukiran | Kaviraj | K. S. Chithra |
| Malla | "Ee Preethiya Maredu" | V Ravichandran | V Ravichandran | K. S. Chithra |
| Praana | "Prema Enidu" | Aallwyn Fernandes | | |
| Ramakrishna | "Gandhada Gudi" | S. A. Rajkumar | K. Kalyan | K. S. Chithra |
| Ramakrishna | "Chandulli Nanna" | S. A. Rajkumar | K. Kalyan | |
| Sahukara | "Kokkare Koli Chendu" | Rajesh Ramanath | K. Kalyan | B. Jayashree |
| Sahukara | "Obbane Obbane" | Rajesh Ramanath | K. Kalyan | |
| Srusti | "Premada Hoove" | S. A. Rajkumar | | K. S. Chithra |
| Srusti | "Hrudayada Thumba" | S. A. Rajkumar | | |

=== 2005 ===
| Film | Song | Composer(s) | Writer(s) | Co-singer(s) |
|---|---|---|---|---|
| Aham Premasmi | "Eshwar" | V Ravichandran | V Ravichandran | L. N. Shastri |
| Aham Premasmi | "O Preethiye" | V Ravichandran | V Ravichandran | Suma S |
| Anna Thangi | "Anna Thangiyara" | Hamsalekha | Hamsalekha | K. S. Chithra |
| Auto Shankar | "Ready Ready" | Gurukiran | Kaviraj | |
| Green Signal | "Jopana Jopana" | Venkat – Narayan | K. Kalyan | |
| Jogi | "Yelu Male Myaleri" | Gurukiran | Prem | |
| Karnana Sampatthu | "Banda Banda San" | Guru | Hoysala | |
| Karnana Sampatthu | "Mysore Maava" | Guru | R Shantharam Kanagal | Manjula |
| Karnana Sampatthu | "Benaka Benaka" | Guru | A D Gowrishankar | Manjula |
| Karnana Sampatthu | "Ambiya Kaanalu" | Guru | M N Vyasa Rao | Guru Ravi |
| Karnana Sampatthu | "Kaliyuga Karnane" | Guru | M N Vyasa Rao | Guru Ravi |
| Nenapirali | "Koorakk Kukkaralli" | Hamsalekha | Hamsalekha | |
| Swamy | "Dikkettu Ninthaga" | Gurukiran | V. Nagendra Prasad | |
| Thunta | "Dede Dede" | V Ravichandran | V Ravichandran | K. S. Chithra |
| Thunta | "Preethsona Baa" | V Ravichandran | V Ravichandran | K. S. Chithra |
| Valmiki | "Marthanda Rupam" | Gurukiran | Gudaraj Halageri | |
| Varsha | "Kanneerige Kanneerenu" | S. A. Rajkumar | S. Narayan | K. S. Chithra |
| Varsha | "Idenidu Badukina" | S. A. Rajkumar | S. Narayan | |
| Vishnu Sena | "History Gottha" | Deva | Upendra | |
| Vishnu Sena | "Meghave Meghave" | Deva | V. Nagendra Prasad | Anuradha Sriram |
| Vishnu Sena | "Benki Kaddi Hacchi" | Deva | V. Nagendra Prasad | K. S. Chithra |

=== 2006 ===
| Film | Song | Composer(s) | Writer(s) | Co-singer(s) |
|---|---|---|---|---|
| Ajay | "Saahasa" | Mani Sharma | K. Kalyan | |
| Eesha | "Raagakke Swaravaagi" | K A Rahman | Theja | K. S. Chithra |
| Hatavadi | "Chali Chali" | V Ravichandran | V Ravichandran | K. S. Chithra |
| Hatavadi | "Ee Preethigagi" | V Ravichandran | V Ravichandran | |
| Hatavadi | "Mukhadalli Yenide" | V Ravichandran | V Ravichandran | |
| Hatavadi | "Oorella Suthi" | V Ravichandran | V Ravichandran | |
| Hatavadi | "Yaramma Ivalu" | V Ravichandran | V Ravichandran | |
| Hetthavara Kanasu | "Atthe Maneyalli" | Vandemataram Srinivas | K. Kalyan | |
| Jothe Jotheyali | "Punyakane" | V. Harikrishna | V. Nagendra Prasad | |
| Gandugali Kumara Rama | "O Prema" | Gurukiran | M N Vyasarao | K. S. Chithra |
| Mahanagara | "Chanchale Nanna" | Naga Mahesh | K. Kalyan | |
| Neelakanta | "Ammammamo" | V Ravichandran | V Ravichandran | Nanditha |
| Neelakanta | "Devaru Bareda Katheyalli" | V Ravichandran | V Ravichandran | Nanditha |
| Neelakanta | "Andada Bombege" | V Ravichandran | V Ravichandran | |
| Neelakanta | "Devaru Bareda"(Sad) | V Ravichandran | V Ravichandran | |
| Odahuttidavalu | "Maathu Belli Kane" | R. P. Patnaik | | |
| Odahuttidavalu | "Thangi Naguthaale" | R. P. Patnaik | | |
| Pandavaru | "Jataapati" | Hamsalekha | Hamsalekha | Hemanth |
| Shishya | "Annamma" | V. Nagendra Prasad | V. Nagendra Prasad | |
| Sirivantha | "Koosumari" | S. A. Rajkumar | S. Narayan | K. S. Chithra |
| Sirivantha | "Edege Sidilu" | S. A. Rajkumar | S. Narayan | |
| Sirivantha | "Yaaro Yaaro Ee Naalvaru" | S. A. Rajkumar | S. Narayan | |
| Tananam Tananam | "Koogalatheya Dooradalli" | K. Kalyan | K. Kalyan | K. S. Chithra |
| Thandege Thakka Maga | "Kaveri Seemeyaaga" | S. A. Rajkumar | Doddarange Gowda | |
| Thandege Thakka Maga | "Dore Dore" | S. A. Rajkumar | Kaviraj | |
| Thandege Thakka Maga | "Namma Oora Deepa" | S. A. Rajkumar | Doddarange Gowda | Baby Vyshali |
| Thavarina Siri | "Hasidaga Anna" | Hamsalekha | Hamsalekha | |

=== 2007 ===
| Film | Song | Composer(s) | Writer(s) | Co-singer(s) |
|---|---|---|---|---|
| Amrutha Vaani | "Gelathana Gelathana" | M P Naidu | Hamsalekha | Shaan |
| Anatharu | "Jagave Rakshasara" | Sadhu Kokila | Ranganth | |
| Dheemantha Manushya | "Maga Maga" | Karthik Raja | Tharani | |
| Ee Bandhana | "Ugadi Ugadi" | Mano Murthy | K. Kalyan | Nanditha |
| Ekadantha | "Ganapathi Bappa" | Gurukiran | V. Manohar | K. S. Chithra |
| Ekadantha | "Ekadantha" | Gurukiran | Goturi | K. S. Chithra |
| Hetthare Hennanne Herabeku | "Thaayi Thande" | Mano Murthy | Hrudaya Shiva | K. S. Chithra |
| Hetthare Hennanne Herabeku | "Thaangali Thandide" | Mano Murthy | Jayanth Kaikini | K. S. Chithra |
| Hetthare Hennanne Herabeku | "Onde Suryana" | Mano Murthy | Kaviraj | K. S. Chithra |
| Maathaad Maathaadu Mallige | "Banna Bannada Hoove" | Mano Murthy | Nagathihalli Chandrashekhar | Shreya Ghoshal |
| Manmatha | "Danthada Bombe" | Bharathi Das | | |
| Nali Naliyutha | "Ee Gandu Yaaro" | Rajesh Ramanath | Rudramurthy Sastry | |
| Nanu Needu Jodi | "Madlinga Madve" | Hamsalekha | Hamsalekha | |
| No 73, Shanthi Nivasa | "Geeya Geeya Thirugo" | Bharadwaj | K. Kalyan | |
| No 73, Shanthi Nivasa | "Geeya Geeya"(Remix) | Bharadwaj | K. Kalyan | |
| Ondu Preethiya Kathe | "Indu Yaaro Bareda" | Gandharva | Rajashekar Rao | |
| Ondu Preethiya Kathe | "Kaamanabilla" | Gandharva | Rajashekar Rao | K. S. Chithra |
| Orata I Love You | "Banthu Banthu" | G R Shankar | K. Kalyan | |
| Orata I Love You | "Adu Hyanga" | G R Shankar | K. Kalyan | M D Pallavi |
| Pallakki | "Avva Kano Kannada" | Gurukiran | Shivananje Gowda | |
| Parodi | "Yeddu Baaro" | Rajesh Ramanath | Upendra | |
| Poojari | "Ilibyada Maga" | Abhimann Roy | Srinivas | Badri Prasad |
| Right Adre | "Bhoomiyantholu" | Neel | Shivasamay | |
| Savi Savi Nenapu | "Nenapu Nenapu" | R. P. Patnaik | Hrudaya Shiva | |
| Santha | "Bhagavantha | Gurukiran | Murali Mohan | |
| SMS 6260 | "Nodamma Hudugi" | Michael, Lokesh, Ravi | Hamsalekha | Latha Hamsalekha |
| Snehana Preethina | "Jagave Barali" | V. Harikrishna | V. Nagendra Prasad | K. S. Chithra, Srinivas |
| Snehana Preethina | "Nanna Chanchale" | V. Harikrishna | V. Nagendra Prasad | Shreya Ghoshal |
| Sri Danamma Devi | "Manasu Embo" | Hamsalekha | Hamsalekha | |
| Sri Danamma Devi | "Ee Mathu Keli Balu Maye" | Hamsalekha | Hamsalekha | |
| Sri Danamma Devi | "Dharege" | Hamsalekha | Hamsalekha | |
| Sri Kshetra Kaivara Thathayya | "Ee Dehadamaneyalli" | Hamsalekha | Thathayya Keerthane | |
| Sri Kshetra Kaivara Thathayya | "Mareyalarenamma" | Hamsalekha | Thathayya Keerthane | |
| Ugadi | "Devare Dharegiyaliyali" | R. P. Patnaik | K. Kalyan | Nanditha |

=== 2008 ===
| Film | Song | Composer(s) | Writer(s) | Co-singer(s) |
|---|---|---|---|---|
| Accident | "Ninade Ninade" | Ricky Kej | Rajendra Karanth | |
| Akasha Gange | "Gange Gange" | Deva | K. Kalyan | |
| Akasha Gange | "Malli Malli" | Deva | K. Kalyan | K. S. Chithra |
| Akasha Gange | "Manase Prithiya" | Deva | K. Kalyan | |
| Baa Bega Chandamama | "Hey Maamu" | H G Murali | Jayanth Kaikini | H G Murali |
| Bandhu Balaga | "Amma Ee Jeeva" | Hamsalekha | Hamsalekha | |
| Bandhu Balaga | "Kasu Beda Javade" | Hamsalekha | Hamsalekha | |
| Citizen | "Agnikunda" | Vandemataram Srinivas | | |
| Ganga Kaveri | "Ganga Kaveri" | K. Kalyan | K. Kalyan | |
| Ganga Kaveri | "Ambara Ambaradaje" | K. Kalyan | K. Kalyan | |
| Ganga Kaveri | "Mareyada Nenapu"(Bit) | K. Kalyan | K. Kalyan | |
| Ganga Kaveri | "Kodavara Kolu" | K. Kalyan | K. Kalyan | Sunitha, Sunitha Sanje, Shruti |
| Ganga Kaveri | "Ninnallu Nannallu" | K. Kalyan | K. Kalyan | K. S. Chithra |
| Ganga Kaveri | "Manjina Thavaranu"(Bit) | K. Kalyan | K. Kalyan | |
| Ganga Kaveri | "Utthara Druvada"(Bit) | K. Kalyan | K. Kalyan | |
| Ganga Kaveri | "Chimmithu Gangeya"(Bit) | K. Kalyan | K. Kalyan | |
| Huttidare Kannada Nadalli Huttabeku | "Jaya Bhartha" | K M Indhra | K M Indhra | K Muniraju |
| Janumada Gelathi | "Dhaga Dhagiso" | V. Manohar | V. Manohar | |
| Jnana Jyothi Sri Siddaganga | "Kirana Banthamma" | K Yuvaraj | Omkar BA | |
| Jnana Jyothi Sri Siddaganga | "Harana Karunodaya" | K Yuvaraj | G S Shivarudrappa | |
| Manasugula Mathu Madhura | "Hadinelu Chaithrada" | K. Kalyan | K. Kalyan | |
| Mandakini | "Belagali Kannada" | K. Kalyan | K. Kalyan | K. S. Chithra |
| Paramesha Panwala | "Sum Sumke" | V. Harikrishna | V. Nagendra Prasad | Shamitha Malnad |
| Payana | "Ekaanthada Mouna" | V. Harikrishna | V. Nagendra Prasad | |
| Premigagi Naa | "Preethiya Sundara" | Rajesh Ramanath | PV Nanjarage | K. S. Chithra |
| Premigagi Naa | "Naa Haduve" | Rajesh Ramanath | Snehapriya | K. S. Chithra |
| Rocky | "Snehada Chiguru" | Venkat Narayan | Panchajanya | Priyadarshini |
| Varasdara | "Pannerina Swathiya" | Rajesh Ramanath | Shivu Jhamakandi | Nagachandrika |
| Yuga Yugagale Saagali | "Nava Pallaviya" | Hamsalekha | Hamsalekha | K. S. Chithra |

=== 2009 ===
| Film | Song | Composer(s) | Writer(s) | Co-singer(s) |
|---|---|---|---|---|
| Abhimaani | "Jagadalle" | Dharmateja | | |
| Ambari | "O Aluthaave" | V. Harikrishna | | |
| Auto | "Shatha Shathamaanagale" | Vijaykrishna Mysore | Mallikarjun Mutthalageri | |
| Bellary Naga | "Haithlagori" | L. N. Shastri | Kaviraj | L. N. Shastri |
| Bellary Naga | "Mathhe Mathhe" | L. N. Shastri | Kaviraj | Suma Sastry |
| Devaru Kotta Thangi | "Kannadakke Saatiyilla" | Hamsalekha | Hamsalekha | |
| Eshtu Nagthi Nagu | "Maya" | M S Maruthi | | |
| Idya Madyara | "Preethiyaga Biddaru" | Kiran Godkhindi | Yashvanth Sardeshpande | |
| Idya Madyara | "Nee Jothe Iruveya" | Kiran Godkhindi | Yashvanth Sardeshpande | Chaitra |
| Idya Madyara | "Anakondaddu Ondu" | Kiran Godkhindi | Yashvanth Sardeshpande | |
| Idya Madyara | "Yako Hendthi" | Kiran Godkhindi | Yashvanth Sardeshpande | Mangala Ravi |
| Jhossh | "Jothe Jotheyali" | Vardhan | Kaviraj | S. Janaki, Anuradha Bhat |
| KA-99 B-333 | "Kamanna Kattige" | S Nagu | | |
| Kannadadda Kiran Bedi | "Amrutha Kannada" | Hamsalekha | | |
| Kempa | "Hoova Chelliro" | Gurukiran | | |
| Namyajamanru | "Dundu Bhoomige" | Hamsalekha | | |
| Namyajamanru | "Gombe Mari" | Hamsalekha | | |
| Namyajamanru | "Ninne Rathri" | Hamsalekha | | |
| Namyajamanru | "Vadhu Varare" | Hamsalekha | | |
| Rajakumari | "Kuhoo Kuhoo" | V. Harikrishna | | |
| Raaj: The Showman | "O Kempa" | V. Harikrishna | V. Nagendra Prasad | Dr. Rajkumar |
| Salute | "Mastthu Kano Mastthu" | Sai Karthik | K. Kalyan | |
| Salute | "Banda Banda Sevaka" | Sai Karthik | Ram Narayan | |
| Shivamani | "Yaarige Yaaruntu" | Veer Samarth | | |
| Thabbali | "O Bramhane Nee" | Sadhu Kokila | | |
| Auto | "Shatha Shathamaanagale" | Vijayakrishna Mysore | | |

=== 2010 ===
| Film | Song | Composer(s) | Writer(s) | Co-singer(s) |
|---|---|---|---|---|
| Aptharakshaka | "Chamundi Taayi Aane" | Gurukiran | | |
| Aptharakshaka | "Kabadi Kabadi" | Gurukiran | | |
| Aptharakshaka | "Garane Gara Garane" | Gurukiran | | |
| Aptharakshaka | "Rakshaka Aptharakshaka" | Gurukiran | | |
| Cheluveye Ninne Nodalu | "Cheluveye Ninne Nodalu" | V. Harikrishna | | |
| Eno Onthara | "Antara Heegeke" | V. Harikrishna | | |
| Hoo | "Sarigama Sari" | V. Harikrishna | | |
| Hoo | "Dheem Dheem" | V. Harikrishna | | |
| Hoo | "Sarigama Sari"(Bit) | V. Harikrishna | | |
| Kiccha Huccha | "Modala Baari" | V. Harikrishna | | |
| Ku Ku | "Om Gam Ganeshaya" | Sagar Nagabhushan | Sagar Nagabhushan | |
| Kunidu Kunidu Bare | "Don't Worry" | K. Kalyan | K. Kalyan | |
| Kunidu Kunidu Bare | "Bannada Thingale" | K. Kalyan | K. Kalyan | |
| Kunidu Kunidu Bare | "Lovva Illa Dovva" | K. Kalyan | K. Kalyan | Manjula Gururaj |
| Lift Kodla | "Manasondu Iddare Marga" | V. Manohar | | |
| Mesthru | "Nooru Nenepugala" | K M Indhra | | |
| Mylari | "Ghallu Ghallenuntha" | Gurukiran | | |
| Nanjangud Nanjunda | "Vandane Nanjuda" | K V Ravichandran | | |
| Nannavanu | "Modalane Baari" | Ilaiyaraaja | | |
| Nannavanu | "Om Shivoham" | Ilaiyaraaja | | |
| Nannavanu | "Devaadi Deva"(Bit) | Ilaiyaraaja | | |
| Preethi Nee Shashwathana | "Entha Chendadudugi" | K. Kalyan | | |
| Preethiya Theru | "Enayithe Ninge Menake" | Prasad | | |
| Premism | "Mysorege Aishu Bandalu" | Hamsalekha | | |
| Rowdy Hrudaya | "Longu Machchu" | Ravishankar | | |
| Rowdy Hrudaya | "Endendu Nagunagutha" | Ravishankar | | |
| School Master | "Chinnumari Pappumari" | V. Sridhar | | |
| School Master | "Ee Lokavella Guruvu" | V. Sridhar | | |
| School Master | "Naguvalle Chellide" | V. Sridhar | | |
| Super | "Yeri Mele Yeri" | V. Harikrishna | | |
| Thipparalli Tharlegalu | "Kannalle Kannalle" | M N Krupakar | | |

=== 2011–2021 ===
| | Film | Song | Composer(s) | Writer(s) | Co-artist(s) |
|---|---|---|---|---|---|
| 2011 | Banna Bannada Loka | "E Loka" | Thomas Rathnam | Kavi Kempagiri | |
| 2011 | College College | "Aa Swapna Lokada" | Gandhidas | Malavalli Saikrishna | |
| 2011 | Devadas | "Saraayi Shisheyali" | Joshua Sridhar | S. Narayan | |
| 2011 | Dhool | "Nanna Neenu Gellalare" | V. Harikrishna | V. Nagendra Prasad | |
| 2011 | Ee Sanje | "Eno Onthara" | Jai Shiva | Hemanth Das | K. S. Chithra |
| 2011 | Ishta | "Kaayo Manase" | M Sanjeev | | |
| 2011 | Ishta | "Bhoomi Mele" | M Sanjeev | | |
| 2011 | Kalgejje | "Malegalada Munjaneya" | Gandharva | | |
| 2011 | Maryade Ramanna | "Harom Hara" | M. M. Keeravani | K. Kalyan | |
| 2011 | Sogasugara | "Saavira Bannada" | Rajesh Ramanath | K. Kalyan | |
| 2011 | Sogasugara | "Olave Ninna"(Duet) | Rajesh Ramanath | K. Kalyan | Sujatha Mohan |
| 2012 | Narasimha | "Lanchampampa" | Hamsalekha | | |
| 2012 | Parie | "Ninna Premada" | Veer Samarth | K S Narasimha Swamy | |
| 2012 | Sangolli Rayanna | "Veera Bhoomi" | Yashovardhan Hari Krishna | Keshavadithya | |
| 2012 | Sri Kshetra Adi Chunchanagiri | "Banu Bhuvi Meerida" | Gurukiran | Doddarangegowda | |
| 2012 | Sri Kshetra Adi Chunchanagiri | "Nimagaagiye" | Gurukiran | Doddarangegowda | |
| 2012 | Thoofan | "Thaayige Magana" | Elvin Joshwa | V. Nagendra Prasad | |
| 2013 | Appayya | "Chiraruni Naa" | S. Narayan | | Hemanth Kumar |
| 2013 | Bulbul | "Junior Senior" | V. Harikrishna | Kaviraj | Tippu |
| 2013 | Ee Bhoomi Aa Bhanu | "Kanase Kanase" | Prem Kumar S | B H Mallikrajun | |
| 2014 | Agraja | "Vandematharam" | Nandan Raj | Panchajanya | |
| 2014 | Ambareesha | "Gandara Ganda" | V. Harikrishna | V. Nagendra Prasad | |
| 2015 | Lodde | "Lodde Dance" | Charan Banzo | Hrudaya Shiva | |
| 2015 | Thippaji Circle | "Youvana Hoo Bana" | Bharani Sri | Mohd Ghouse Peer | |
| 2016 | Lakshmana | "Chandamama" | Arjun Janya | V. Nagendra Prasad | Anuradha Bhat |
| 2016 | Mast Mohabbat | "Arulu Marulu" | Mano Murthy | Raghu Shastry | |
| 2016 | Mr. Mommaga | "Akasha Chandramma" | N. R. Raghunanthan | Malavalli Saikrishna | |
| 2018 | Prema Baraha | "Jai Hanumantha" | Jassie Gift | Vijaya Naarasimha, Gotturi | Tippu |
| 2019 | Kavacha | "Rekkeya"(Duet) | 4 Musics | V. Nagendra Prasad | Sreya Jayadeep |
| 2020 | Mayabazar 2016 | "Loka Maya Bazaru" | Midhun Mukundan | Yogaraj Bhat | |
| 2021 | Akshi | "Banna Banna" | Kaaledegula Srinivas | | |
