= K. Balachander filmography =

Filmography of Indian filmmaker K. Balachander

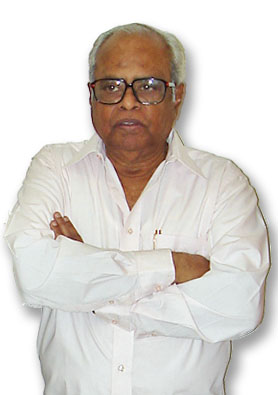
K. Balachander

This following is the list of films to which K. Balachander has contributed. He has written and directed nearly 80 films and has worked in more than 100 films either as director or writer in predominantly Tamil-language films. He has directed some Telugu films while the rest of his Telugu, Hindi and Kannada films were either remakes or simultaneously shot versions of his Tamil films. He has also directed Tamil remakes of Telugu films. He has produced one Malayalam film.

== Films ==
=== As director ===
Year	Film	Language	Notes
1965	Neerkumizhi	Tamil	Directorial debut
1965	Naanal	Tamil	
1966	Major Chandrakanth	Tamil	
1967	Bama Vijayam	Tamil	
1967	Anubavi Raja Anubavi	Tamil	
1968	Bhale Kodallu	Telugu	
1968	Thamarai Nenjam	Tamil	Tamil Nadu State Film Award for Best Dialogue Writer
1968	Ethir Neechal	Tamil	Tamil Nadu State Film Award for Best Dialogue Writer
1969	Poova Thalaiya	Tamil	
1969	Sattekalapu Satteya	Telugu	
1969	Iru Kodugal	Tamil	National Film Award for Best Feature Film in Tamil
1970	Patham Pasali	Tamil	Remake of Sattekalapu Satteyya
1970	Ethiroli	Tamil	
1970	Navagraham	Tamil	
1970	Kaaviya Thalaivi	Tamil	
1971	Naangu Suvargal	Tamil	First colour film in his direction
1971	Nootrukku Nooru	Tamil	
1971	Bomma Borusa	Telugu	Remake of Poova Thalaiya
1971	Punnagai	Tamil	
1972	Kanna Nalama	Tamil	
1972	Velli Vizha	Tamil	
1973	Arangetram	Tamil	
1973	Sollathaan Ninaikkiren	Tamil	25th Film
1974	Aaina	Hindi	Remake of Arangetram
1974	Aval Oru Thodar Kathai	Tamil	Filmfare Award for Best Tamil Director
1974	Naan Avanillai	Tamil	
1975	Apoorva Raagangal	Tamil	National Film Award for Best Feature Film in Tamil; Filmfare Award for Best Tamil Director
1976	Manmadha Leelai	Tamil	
1976	Anthuleni Katha	Telugu	Remake of Aval Oru Thodar Kathai
1976	Moondru Mudichu	Tamil	Remake of O Seeta Katha
1977	Avargal	Tamil	
1977	Pattina Pravesam	Tamil	
1978	Nizhal Nijamagiradhu	Tamil	
1978	Maro Charitra	Telugu	Filmfare Award for Best Telugu Director
1978	Thappida Thala	Kannada	
1978	Thappu Thalangal	Tamil	Tamil Nadu State Film Award for Best Dialogue Writer
1979	Ninaithale Inikkum	Tamil	
1979	Andamaina Anubhavam	Telugu	
1979	Nool Veli	Tamil	
1979	Guppedu Manasu	Telugu	
1979	Idi Katha Kaadu	Telugu	Remake of Avargal
1980	Varumayin Niram Sivappu	Tamil	Filmfare Award for Best Tamil Director; Tamil Nadu State Film Award for Best Director
1981	Aakali Rajyam	Telugu	
1981	Adavaalu Meeku Joharulu	Telugu	
1981	Tholikodi Koosindi	Telugu	Nandi Award for Best Director
1981	Enga Ooru Kannagi	Tamil	
1981	Thillu Mullu	Tamil	
1981	Thaneer Thaneer	Tamil	National Film Award for Best Feature Film in Tamil; National Film Award for Best Screenplay; Filmfare Award for Best Tamil Director
1981	Ek Duuje Ke Liye	Hindi	Remake of Maro Charitra; Filmfare Award for Best Screenplay; Nominated—Filmfare Award for Best Story; Nominated—Filmfare Award for Best Director
1981	47 Natkal	Tamil	Bilingual film
1981	47 Rojulu	Telugu	Bilingual film
1982	Agni Sakshi	Tamil	
1983	Benkiyalli Aralida Hoovu	Kannada	Remake of Aval Oru Thodar Kathai
1983	Poikkal Kudhirai	Tamil	50th Film
1983	Zara Si Zindagi	Hindi	Remake of Varumayin Niram Sivappu
1983	Kokilamma	Telugu	
1984	Ek Nai Paheli	Hindi	Remake of Apoorva Raagangal
1984	Achamillai Achamillai	Tamil	National Film Award for Best Feature Film in Tamil; Filmfare Award for Best Tamil Director
1984	Eradu Rekhegalu	Kannada	Remake of Iru Kodugal
1985	Kalyana Agathigal	Tamil	
1985	Sindhu Bhairavi	Tamil	
1985	Mugila Mallige	Kannada	Remake of Thamarai Nenjam
1986	Sundara Swapnagalu	Kannada	Remake of Sollathaan Ninaikkiren
1986	Punnagai Mannan	Tamil	
1987	Manathil Uruthi Vendum	Tamil	
1988	Rudraveena	Telugu	Nargis Dutt Award for Best Feature Film on National Integration
1988	Unnal Mudiyum Thambi	Tamil	Remake of Rudraveena
1989	Pudhu Pudhu Arthangal	Tamil	75th Film Filmfare Award for Best Tamil Director; Tamil Nadu State Film Award for Best Director
1990	Oru Veedu Iru Vasal	Tamil	National Film Award for Best Film on Other Social Issues
1991	Azhagan	Tamil	
1992	Vaaname Ellai	Tamil	Filmfare Award for Best Tamil Director
1993	Jathi Malli	Tamil	
1994	Duet	Tamil	
1996	Kalki	Tamil	special appearance
2001	Paarthale Paravasam	Tamil	100th Film
2006	Poi	Tamil	special appearance

=== As actor ===
- Note: all films are in Tamil, unless otherwise noted.

Year	Film	Role	Notes
1996	Kalki	Movie director	Special appearance
1999	Poovellam Kettuppar	Himself	Special appearance
2002	Kadhal Virus	Himself	Special appearance
2006	Poi	The man who plays dice with fate	
2008	Kuselan	Himself	Special appearance
2010	Rettaisuzhi	Ramaswamy	
2014	Ninaithathu Yaaro	Himself	Special appearance
2015	Uthama Villain	Margadarshi	Posthumous Film

=== As writer ===
This is a list of films that he wrote but did not direct.

- Note: all films are in Tamil, unless otherwise noted.

Year	Film	Notes
1964	Dheiva Thaai	
1964	Server Sundaram	
1965	Poojaikku Vandha Malar	
1965	Neela Vanam	

=== As producer ===
Year	Film	Language	Notes
1985	Idanilangal	Malayalam	

== Television serials ==
- Aanandham Vilayaadum Veedu (Kalaignar TV)
- Amudha Oru Aacharyakuri (Kalaignar TV)
- Anni (Jaya TV)
- Balachanderin Chinna Thiraigal
- Chhoti Si Asha (Hindi) (Sony Entertainment Television)
- Comedy Colony (Jaya TV)
- Engirundho Vandhaal (Jaya TV)
- Jannal-1 Sila Nijangal Sila Nyayangal (Sun TV/Raj TV)
- Jannal-2 Aduththa Veettu Kavithai (Sun TV/Raj TV)
- Jannal-3 Ammaavukku Rendula Raagu (Sun TV/Raj TV)
- Jannal-4 Marabu Kavithaigal (Raj TV)
- Kadhal Ondru Vaangi Vandhean (Sun TV)
- Kadhal Pagadai (Sun TV)
- Kasalavu Nesam (Sun TV/Raj TV/ Vasanth TV)
- Kai Alavu Manasu (Sun TV/ Raj TV/ Vasanth TV)
- Nilavai Pidippom (Raj TV)
- Premi (Sun TV/Raj TV)
- Raghu Vamsam (Sun TV)
- Rail Sneham (Doordarshan Podhigai)
- Ramany vs Ramany (Raj TV)
- Rekkai Kattiya Manasu (Raj TV)
- Sahana (Jaya TV)
- Shanthi Nilayam (Jaya TV)
- Sollathaan Ninaikkirean (Zee Tamil)
