= List of awards and nominations received by K. Balachander =

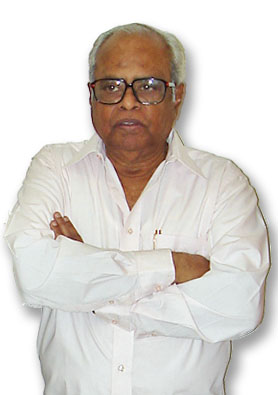
Balachander pictured in 2006

K. Balachander is an Indian film director, screenwriter and producer who works mainly in the Tamil film industry. He is well known for his distinct film-making style often dealing with interpersonal relationships and themes of social relevance.

Starting his career as a playwright, he made his cinematic debut as a dialog writer for Dheiva Thaai in 1964. The following year he made his directional debut through Neer Kumizhi a film based on his own play. He secured his first National Film Award for Iru Kodugal, a family drama film released in 1969. His 1975 film Apoorva Raagangal won the award for the Best Feature Film in Tamil. The 1981 Tamil film Thanneer Thanneer that dealt with social issues such as water scarcity and political corruption fetched him the National Film Award for Best Screenplay and the Best Regional Film award. He started his own production house in 1981 and named it Kavithalayaa Productions which produced several of his award-winning films like Achamillai Achamillai and Sindhu Bhairavi. His three films were included in CNN-IBNs List of the 100 Greatest Indian Films of All Time - Maro Charitra, Ek Duuje ke liye and Thanneer Thanneer. He also made forays into Telugu cinema, Hindi cinema and Kannada cinema. His Maro Charitra and its Hindi remake Ek Duuje Ke Liye were huge box-office success and received critical acclaim. For Ek Duuje Ke Liye he received three Filmfare nominations—Best Story, Best Screenplay and Best Director—eventually winning the award for the Best Screenplay. The film was highly responsible in catapulting Balachander to national acclaim. Rudraveena fetched him the Nargis Dutt Award for Best Feature Film on National Integration in 1988. Four years later Roja, a Kavithaalaya production won the same award.

As of 2013, Balachander has directed over 80 films and has worked in more than 100 films either as director or a screenwriter. In 1987 he was honoured with the Padma Shri, India's fourth highest civilian honour. He has won nine National Film Awards and multiple Filmfare Awards. Balachander is also a recipient of various state awards like the Tamil Nadu State Film Awards and the Nandi Awards, instituted by the Government of Andhra Pradesh. In 2010 the Dadasaheb Phalke Award was bestowed upon him for his contributions to Indian cinema; he was the second personality and the first director from Tamil cinema to receive the award. The following year he was awarded with the ANR National Award by the Government of Andhra Pradesh.

== Civilian honors ==
Year	Award	Honouring body	Outcome	Ref
1987	Padmashri	Government of India	Won	

== National Film Awards ==
Year	Film	Category	Outcome	Ref
1969	Iru Kodugal	Best Tamil Film	Won	
1975	Apoorva Raagangal	Best Tamil Film	Won	
1981	Thaneer Thaneer	Best Tamil Film	Won	
1981	Thaneer Thaneer	Best Screenplay	Won	
1984	Achamillai Achamillai	Best Tamil Film	Won	
1988	Rudraveena	Nargis Dutt Award for Best Feature Film on National Integration	Won	
1991	Oru Veedu Iru Vaasal	National Film Award for Best Film on Other Social Issues	Won	
1992	Roja	Nargis Dutt Award for Best Feature Film on National Integration	Won	
2010	Dadasaheb Phalke Award		Won	.

== Filmfare Awards ==
Year	Film	Category	Outcome	Ref
1981	Ek Duuje Ke Liye	Best Screenplay	Won	
1981	Ek Duuje Ke Liye	Best Director	Nominated	
1981	Ek Duuje Ke Liye	Best Story	Nominated	

== Filmfare Awards South ==
Balachander holds the record for being nominated for the Filmfare Best Tamil Director Award most number of times, being eighteen. He has won the award 7 times.

Year	Film	Language	Category	Outcome	Ref
1974	Aval Oru Thodar Kathai	Tamil	Best Tamil Director	Won	
1975	Apoorva Raagangal	Tamil	Best Tamil Director	Won	
1976	Moondru Mudichu	Tamil	Best Tamil Director	Nominated	
1976	Anthuleni Katha	Telugu	Best Telugu Director	Nominated	
1977	Avargal	Tamil	Best Tamil Director	Nominated	
1978	Maro Charitra	Telugu	Best Telugu Director	Won	
1979	Ninaithale Inikkum	Tamil	Best Tamil Director	Nominated	
1979	Guppedu Manasu	Telugu	Best Telugu Director	Nominated	
1980	Varumayin Niram Sivappu	Tamil	Best Director	Won	
1981	Thaneer Thaneer	Tamil	Best Director	Won	
1982	Agni Sakshi	Tamil	Best Tamil Director	Nominated	
1984	Achamillai Achamillai	Tamil	Best Film	Won	
1984	Achamillai Achamillai	Tamil	Best Director	Won	
1985	Sindhu Bhairavi	Tamil	Best Director	Won	
1985	Sindhu Bhairavi	Tamil	Best Director	Nominated	
1986	Punnagai Mannan	Tamil	Best Director	Nominated	
1988	Rudraveena	Tamil	Best Director	Nominated	
1988	Unnal Mudiyum Thambi	Tamil	Best Director	Nominated	
1989	Pudhu Pudhu Arthangal	Tamil	Best Director	Won	
1990	Oru Veedu Iru Vaasal	Tamil	Best Director	Nominated	
1991	Azhagan	Tamil	Best Director	Nominated	
1992	Roja	Tamil	Best Film	Won	
1992	Vaaname Ellai	Tamil	Best Director	Won	
1993	Jathi Malli	Tamil	Best Director	Nominated	
1994	Lifetime Achievement Award			Won	
2004	Saamy	Tamil	Best Film	Nominated	
2006	Ayya	Tamil	Best Film	Nominated	

== Government of Tamil Nadu ==
Year	Award	Honouring body	Outcome	Ref
1973	Kalaimamani	Government of Tamil Nadu	Won	
1992	Arignar Anna Award	Government of Tamil Nadu	Won	

== Honorary doctorate ==
Year	Honour	Honouring body	Outcome	Ref
2005	Doctor of Letters	Sathyabama University	Won	
2005	Doctor of Letters	Alagappa University	Won	
2007	Doctor of Letters	Madras University	Won	

== Tamil Nadu State Film Awards ==
Year	Film	Category	Outcome	Ref
1967	Bama Vijayam	Third Best Film	Won	
1968	Thamarai Nenjam	Best Film (Third)	Won	
1968	Ethir Neechal, Thamarai Nenjam	Best Dialogue Writer	Won	
1978	Thappu Thalangal	Best Dialogue Writer	Won	
1980	Varumayin Niram Sivappu	Best Director	Won	
1982	Agni Sakshi	Best Film (Second prize)	Won	
1989	Pudhu Pudhu Arthangal	Best Director	Won	
1989	Pudhu Pudhu Arthangal	Best Film (Second prize)	Won	
1992	Vaaname Ellai	Story Writer	Won	
1992	Vaaname Ellai	Special Prize (Best Film)	Won	
1992	Roja	Best Film (First prize)	Won	
1993	Jathi Malli	Best Film (First prize)	Won	
1990	Various films	Tamil Nadu State Film Honorary Award	Won	

== Nandi Awards ==
Year	Film	Category	Outcome	Ref
1976	Anthuleni Katha	Best Feature Film (Third prize)	Won	
1981	Tholikodi Koosindi	Best Feature Film (Second prize)	Won	
1981	Tholikodi Koosindi	Best Director	Won	
1982	Kokilamma	Best Screenplay	Won	

== Santhome Awards ==
Year	Film	Category	Outcome	Ref
1988	Manathil Uruthi Vendum	Best Film	Won	

== ANR National Award ==
Year	Recipient	Outcome	Ref
2010	K. Balachander	Won	

== Cine Technicians Association Awards ==
Year	Film	Award	Category	Outcome	Ref
1983	–	–	Best Technician	Won	
1988	Rudraveena	MGR Award	Best Director	Won	

== Other awards ==
- The TV series Kai Alavu Manasu written and directed by him won the Onida Pinnacle Award in 1995.
- "Lifetime Achievement award" at the 39th International Film Festival of India in 2008.
- Chevalier Sivaji Ganesan Award for Excellence in Indian Cinema, Vijay Awards awarded in 2011
