= Tamilanban =

Indian Tamil poet and writer (1933–2025)

Kalaimamani Tamilanban
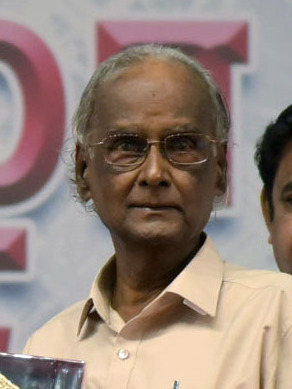
- Tamilanban in 2017
- Born: Natarajan Jegadeesan; 28 September 1933; Chennimalai,Coimbatore District, Madras Presidency, British India (now in Erode district, Tamil Nadu, India)
- Died: 22 November 2025 (aged 92); Chennai, Tamil Nadu, India
- Spouse: Shanthakumari
- Children: Pablo Neruda (son), Bharathidasan (son)
- Parent(s): C.R. Natarajan (Father) & Valliyammal (Mother)
- Writing career
- Pen name: "Erode" Tamilanban
- Language: Tamil
- Subject: Literature
- Notable work: Vanakkam Valluva! (2000)
- Notable awards: Sahitya Akademi Award (2004)
- Website: erodetamilanban.com

Natarajan Jegadeesan (28 September 1933 – 22 November 2025) was a Sahitya Akademi Award winning Tamil was a poet and writer from Tamil Nadu. He was known by his pen name Erode Tamilanban

== Biography ==
Tamilanban was born in Chennimalai. a town in present-day Erode district, Tamil Nadu on 28 September 1933.

== Literary career ==
As a key figure in the 1970s Vanambadi poetry movement, Tamilanban drew upon the deep roots of Tamil literary heritage to help ignite a modern artistic renaissance.

He stands as one of the pioneer poets in adapting Japanese Haiku & Senryū in Tamil.He is also the first poet to publish a large number of poetry collections in Tamil, over 60 collections and 5 major volumes. Thamizhanban is a specialist in the Limerick poetry.He was the first to publish a Limerick style poetry in Tamil collection called Sennimalai Cleopatrakkal and first to create the first travelogues in modern poetry through his collection Un Veettirkku Naan Vandhirundhen (1998)

He is the first poet to courageously condemn the 2009 Tamil Eelam genocide in En Arumai Eelame! when many in Tamil Nadu hesitated. He pioneered musical ghazals in Ghazal Piraihal (2012) and became the first poet whose works inspired two national seminars at the University of Madras. He also coined "Pazhonryu" in Oru Kudai Pazhonryu (2014) by blending proverbs with Senryu.Drawing inspiration from Pablo Neruda's Book of Questions, he authored Kana Kaanum Vinaakkal (2004) and Innum Sila Vinaakkal (2015), achieving the milestone of being the first modern Tamil poet to have his original work translated into English by a native speaker—through Gregory James's Poems of Questions and subsequently into Spanish as Poemas de Preguntas, co-translated by James and Loraine Bock.

In 2004, he was awarded the Sahitya Akademi Award for Tamil for his poetry collection Vanakkam Valluva (lit. Greetings, Valluvar).It was criticism about modern poetry through his poetry.

In 2026, his works were nationalised by the Government of Tamil Nadu

== Television Career ==
He has worked as a Newsreader at the Chennai Doordarshan Kendra from 1975 - 1992 .He was renowned for his impeccable pronunciation and intonation.

== Film Career ==
Tamilanban also worked as Lyricist for few films. He wrote lyrics for few songs in K. Balachander films Achamillai Achamillai(1984) and few more films.

== Membership ==
He served as a General Council Member for Sahitya Akademi from 1998 to 2001. He also served as a member of the executive committee of the Tamil Nadu Iyal Isai Nataka Mandram & the Tamil Nadu Government’s Scientific Tamil Council..

== Death ==
Due to age-related complications and breathing difficulties, he died on 22 November 2025, at the age of 92 in a private hospital.

== Bibliography ==
=== Poetry ===
1. Silirppugal (சிலிர்ப்புகள்) - 1970
2. Vidiyal vizhudugal (விடியல் விழுதுகள்) – 1973
3. Andha nandanai eritha neruppin micham (அந்த நந்தனை எரிச்ச நெருப்பின் மிச்சம்) – 1982
4. Thirumbi vandha thervalam (திரும்பிவந்த தேர்வலம்) – 1985
5. Kannukku veliyae sila kanaakkal (கண்ணுக்கு வெளியே சில கனாக்கள்) – 1990
6. En veetukku ethirae oru erukkan chedi (என் வீட்டு எதிரே ஒரு எருக்கஞ்செடி) – 1995
7. Nadai marandha nadhiyum thisai mariya odayum (நடை மறந்த நதியும் திசை மாறிய ஓடையும்) – 1998
8. Un veetukku naan vandhirundhen (உன் வீட்டிற்கு நான் வந்திருந்தேன் - வால்ட் விட்மன்) – 1999
9. Vanakkam Valluva! (வணக்கம் வள்ளுவ!) – 2000
10. Sennimalai cleopatrakkal (சென்னிமலைக் கிளியோப்பாத்ராக்கள்) – 2002
11. Vaarthaikal ketta varam (வார்த்தைகள் கேட்ட வரம்) – 2002
12. Ivargalodum ivarrodum (இவர்களோடும் இவற்றோடும்) – 2003
13. Kanakaanum vinaakkal (கனாக் காணும் வினாக்கள்) – 2004
14. Minnal urangum podhu (மின்னல் உறங்கும்போது) – 2004
15. Kadhavai thattiya pazhaya kadhali (கதவைத் தட்டிய பழைய காதலி) – 2005
16. Kavin kuru nooru (கவின் குறுநூறு) – 2005
17. Idugurip peyarallai Islam (இடுகுறிப் பெயரில்லை இஸ்லாம்) – 2008
18. Olaichuvadiyum kurunthagadum (ஓலைச்சுவடியும் குறுந்தகடும்) – 2008
19. Solla vandadhu (சொல்ல வந்தது) – 2008
20. Innum Sila Vinaakkal (இன்னும் சில வினாக்கள்) - 2015

=== Essay ===
1. Madhippedugal (மதிப்பீடுகள்) — 2002
2. Pablo Neruda paarvaiyil India (பாப்லோ நெருதா பார்வையில் இந்தியா) – Pablo Neruda Spanish Latin America Research Institute (2007)

=== Memoir ===
1. Bharathidasanodu pathandugal (பாரதிதாசனோடு பத்து ஆண்டுகள்) - 2000

=== Travelogue ===
1. Anaikkava endra America (அணைக்கவா என்ற அமெரிக்கா) — 1999

=== Translated Work ===
1. Poems of questions – Translation by Gregory James. Arimaa Nokku (2018)
2. Glow-worm woods – Translation by Gregory James. Arimaa Nokku (2019)

== Awards and Recognitions ==
=== Awards ===
- Sahitya Akademi Award for Tamil (2004)
- Kalaimamani award - 1999
- S. P. Adithanar Senior Tamil Scholar Award (2017)
- Pavendhar Bharathidasan Award - 1991
- Kalaignar Award - 1998
- Kural Peedam Award -2001
- Tamizhavel Umamaheswaranar Award - 2002
- Periyar Award - 2005
- Kalaignar Porkizhi Award - 2010
- Kavikko Award - 2011
- Parithimar Kalaignar Award
- Semmozhi Gnayiru Award - 2016
- Kamban Kazhagam Prize - 2008
- Thina Thanthi Lifetime Achievement Award - 2017

=== Recognitions ===
- Recited poems at National Symposium of poets at New Delhi - 1978.
- Two days National Seminar conducted by University of Madras based on his writings - 2003.

== See also ==
- List of Sahitya Akademi Award winners for Tamil
- List of Indian writers
- List of Tamil-language writers
