= B. S. Lokanath =

Indian cinematographer

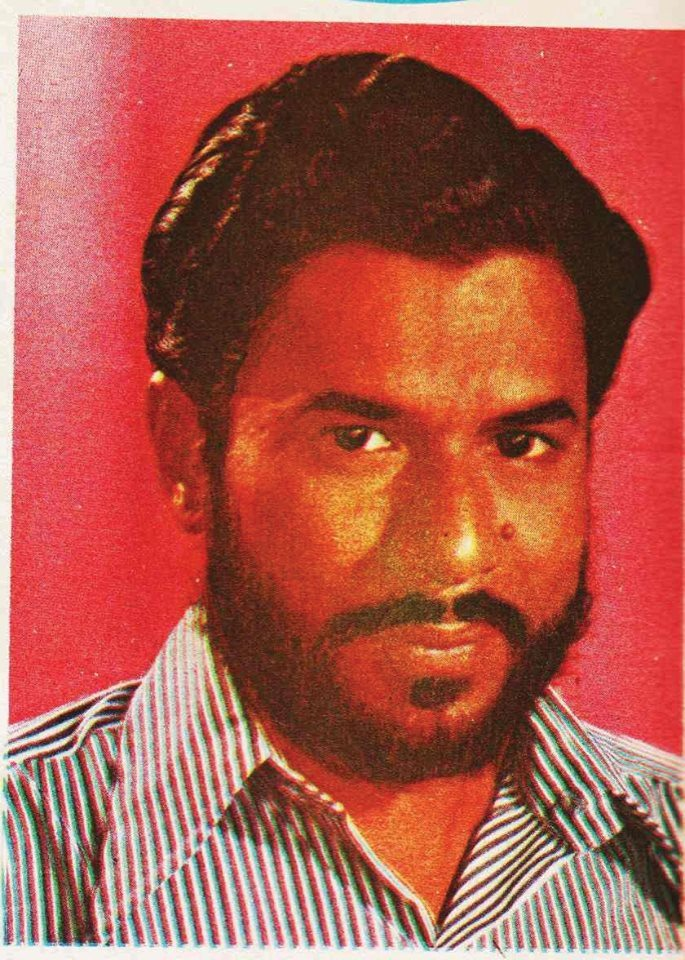
- B. S. Lokanath
- Born: c. 1937; Bangalore, Karnataka
- Died: 9 December 2011; Chennai, India
- Other names: Loknath, Lokanathan
- Occupation: cinematographer
- Years active: 1971 - 1985
- Spouse: R.L.Radha
- Children: B. L. Srinivas, B.L.Sanjay
- Awards: National Film Award for Best Cinematography; Tamil Nadu State Film Award for Best Cinematographer

B. S. Lokanath (c. 1937 – 2011) was an Indian cinematographer who worked in Tamil, Telugu, Kannada and Hindi films. He is well known as the cinematographer of K. Balachander and has worked in 55 films with him. During his career, he won the National Film Award for Best Cinematography for Apoorva Raagangal (1975) and the Tamil Nadu State Film Award for Best Cinematographer for Ninaithale Inikkum (1979). He died of a heart attack in Chennai on 9 December 2011. His son B. L. Sanjay is also an cinematographer.

== Partial filmography ==
- Uttharavindri Ulle Vaa (1971)
- Dhikku Theriyadha Kaattil (1972)
- Arangetram (1973)
- Sollathaan Ninaikkiren (1973)
- Aaina (1974)
- Aval Oru Thodar Kathai (1974)
- Naan Avanillai (1974)
- Apoorva Raagangal (1975)
- Manmatha Leelai (1976)
- Anthuleni Katha (1976)
- Moondru Mudichu (1976)
- Avargal (1977)
- Chilakamma Cheppindi (1977)
- Maro Charitra (1978)
- Pranam Khareedu (1978)
- Nizhal Nijamagiradhu (1978)
- Thappu Thalangal / Thappida Thala (1978)
- Ninaithale Inikkum / Andamaina Anubhavam (1979)
- Nool Veli/ Guppedu Manasu (1979)
- Idi Katha Kaadu (1979)
- Aakali Rajyam (1981)
- Varumayin Niram Sivappu (1981)
- Ek Duuje Ke Liye (1981)
- Thanneer Thanneer (1981)
- Aadavaallu Meeku Joharlu (1981)
- Enga Ooru Kannagi (1981)
- Thillu Mullu (1981)
- 47 Natkal / 47 Rojulu (1981)
- Agni Sakshi (1982)
- Zara Si Zindagi (1983)
- Benkiyalli Aralida Hoovu (1983)
- Poikkal Kudhirai (1983)
- Kokilamma (1983)
- Ek Nai Paheli (1984)
- Achamillai Achamillai (1984)
- Eradu Rekhegalu (1984)
- Haqeeqat (1985)
- Mugila Mallige (1985)
- Oorkavalan (1987)
- Thangathin Thangam (1990)
- Pudhiya Raagam (1991)
- Paarambariyam (1993)
- Ellame En Rasathan (1995)
