= Sambarala Rambabu =

- Poster
- Directed by: G. V. R. Seshagiri Rao
- Story by: K. Balachander
- Based on: Ethir Neechal by K. Balachander
- Produced by: T. Mohan Rao
- Starring: Chalam; Sharada; S. V. Ranga Rao
- Cinematography: Bhaskar Rao Polu
- Edited by: Anki Reddy Veluri
- Music by: V. Kumar
- Production company: Sri Ramana Chitra
- Release date: 14 January 1970
- Country: India
- Language: Telugu

Sambarala Rambabu is a 1970 Indian Telugu-language comedy drama film directed by G. V. R. Seshagiri Rao and produced by T. Mohan Rao. It is a remake of K. Balachander's 1968 Tamil film Ethir Neechal, itself based on his stage play of the same name. The film stars Chalam, Sharada and S. V. Ranga Rao.

== Cast ==
- Chalam as Rambabu
- Sharada as Lakshmi
- S. V. Ranga Rao as Nair
- Gummadi as Lakshmi's father
- Chandra Mohan as Rambabu's friend
- Relangi
- Padmanabham
- Suryakantham
- Geetanjali
- Hemalatha as Lakshmi's mother
- Manorama
- Mikkilineni
- Raavi Kondala Rao
- Radha Kumari
- Prabhakar Reddy
- Ch. Krishna Murthy
- Ramachandra Rao
- Bhusarapu
- Modukuri Satyam
- Master Ravi
- Master Hari

== Production ==
Sambarala Rambabu was directed by G. V. R. Seshagiri Rao and produced by T. Mohan Rao under Sri Ramana Chitra. It is a remake of the 1968 Tamil film Ethir Neechal written and directed by K. Balachander, itself based on his stage play of the same name. S. V. Ranga Rao was cast as the cook Nair. Raman, who played the role on stage, was hired to supervise the shoot. During the filming of the song "Sedi Ketto", Raman suggested that Ranga Rao dance, but the latter refused. After Raman told Ranga Rao that he only had to do a few comic moves, he assented, and the segment attained popularity. Cinematography was handled by Bhaskar Rao Polu and editing by Anki Reddy Veluri.

== Soundtrack ==
The soundtrack of the film was composed by V. Kumar while the lyrics were written by Rajasri. The playback singers were P. Susheela, P. Leela, K. Jamuna Rani, Swarna, P. B. Sreenivas, S. P. Balasubrahmanyam, Pitapuram Nageshwara Rao, J. V. Raghavulu and Madhavapedhi Satyam. The songs "Maamaa Chandamama Vinaraavaa" and "Vinnara Vinnara Ee Vintanu Vinnara" attained popularity.
