= Cheekati Velugulu =

1975 Telugu film

- Directed by: K. S. Prakash Rao
- Written by: Mullapudi Venkata Ramana (dialogues)
- Story by: K. S. Prakash Rao
- Produced by: Kanuri Ranjith Kumar
- Starring: Krishna; Vanisri; Padmapriya
- Music by: K. Chakravarthy
- Production company: Sri Ranjith Movies
- Release date: 11 July 1975
- Country: India
- Language: Telugu

Cheekati Velugulu is a 1975 Indian Telugu-language film directed by K. S. Prakash Rao and produced by Kanuri Ranjith Kumar, marking his debut. The film stars Krishna, Vanisri, and Padmapriya. The film was a box office failure but was appreciated for its songs.

== Cast ==
- Krishna
- Vanisri
- Padmapriya
- Satyanarayana
- Allu Ramalingaiah
- Rama Prabha
- Suryakanthan
- Mikkilineni
- Rao Gopal Rao
- Peketi Sivaram
- Jyothi Lakshmi

== Production ==
The film was made on war backdrop and has expensive shooting costs since the film was shot in Kashmir.

== Soundtrack ==
The music was composed by K. Chakravarthy and features lyrics by Devulapalli, Aatreya, Aarudra, C. Narayana Reddy, Kosaraju, and Prayaga.

- "Cheekati Velugulu" - S. P. Balasubrahmanyam
