= Maa Iddari Katha =

- Theatrical release poster
- Directed by: Nandamuri Ramesh
- Written by: Mailacherapu Gopi(dialogues)
- Screenplay by: Nandamuri Ramesh
- Story by: K. Gopala Krishna
- Produced by: K. Ranjith Kumar; K. Gopala Krishna
- Starring: N. T. Rama Rao; Manjula; Jaya Prada
- Cinematography: V. S. R. Swamy
- Edited by: Nayani Maheswara Rao
- Music by: Chakravarthy
- Production company: Adarsa Chitra
- Release date: 23 September 1977
- Country: India
- Language: Telugu

Maa Iddari Katha (transl. The story of both of us) is a 1977 Indian Telugu-language action-drama film directed by Nandamuri Ramesh. It stars N. T. Rama Rao, Manjula and Jaya Prada, with music composed by Chakravarthy.

== Plot ==
The film begins with two identical siblings, Satyam & Viswam. The first believes in a straight path, and the second the dark to build an ideal society.

== Cast ==
- N. T. Rama Rao as Satyam & Viswam
- Manjula as Geeta
- Jaya Prada as Seeta
- Rao Gopala Rao
- Satyanarayana
- Allu Ramalingaiah
- Raja Babu
- Prabhakar Reddy
- Ramana Murthy
- Mukkamala
- Mada
- Sarathi
- Kakarala
- Pandari Bai
- Roja Ramani as Chandini
- Halam

== Soundtrack ==
Music composed by Chakravarthy.

| Song title | Lyrics | Singers | length |
|---|---|---|---|
| "Manchini Samadhi" | Acharya Aatreya | S. P. Balasubrahmanyam | |
| "Chilaka Pachcha" | Kosaraju | P. Susheela | 3:06 |
| "Chali Chaliga" | Dasaradhi | V. Ramakrishna, P. Susheela | 3:05 |
| "Nenevaro Meku Telusa" | Veturi | S. P. Balasubrahmanyam | |
| "Anuragam" | Dasaradhi | V. Ramakrishna, S. Janaki | |
| "Nallanayyaa Evarani" | Gopi | P. Susheela | 3:25 |
