= Balaparitchai =

- Poster
- Directed by: Muktha Srinivasan
- Screenplay by: Thooyavan
- Story by: Kalaignanam
- Produced by: V. Mohan
- Starring: R. Muthuraman; Sujatha
- Cinematography: Sampath
- Edited by: Krishnan
- Music by: T. M. Soundararajan
- Production company: Anandhi Films
- Release date: 16 June 1977
- Country: India
- Language: Tamil

Balaparitchai (Tamil pronunciation: [balabaɾiːtɕaɪ]; transl. Test of strength) is a 1977 Indian Tamil-language film directed by Muktha Srinivasan and written by Thooyavan from a story by Kalaignanam. The film stars R. Muthuraman and Sujatha. It was released on 16 June 1977, and became a box office success. The film won three Tamil Nadu State Film Awards: Third Best Film, Best Actor Special Prize (Muthuraman) and Best Dialogue Writer (Thooyavan).

== Cast ==
- R. Muthuraman
- Sujatha
- Cho
- Jai Ganesh
- Neelu
- Premanand
- T. M. Soundararajan
- Thengai Srinivasan
- Y. G. Mahendran
- A. Sakunthala
- Prameela
- Vijaya Chandrika
- Y. Vijaya

== Soundtrack ==
The music was composed by T. M. Soundararajan, with lyrics by Vaali. It is Soundararajan's debut at composing.

Track listing
No.	Title	Singer(s)	Length
1.	"Mapillai Saarukku"	T. M. Soundararajan, P. Susheela
2.	"Thepakulathile Thuthiporku"	T. L. Maharajan, Sarala, Madhuri Lalitha

== Release and reception ==
Balaparitchai was released on 16 June 1977, and became a box office success. At the Tamil Nadu State Film Awards, it won the awards for Third Best Film, Best Actor Special Prize (Muthuraman) and Best Dialogue Writer (Thooyavan).
