= Ravisubramaniyan =

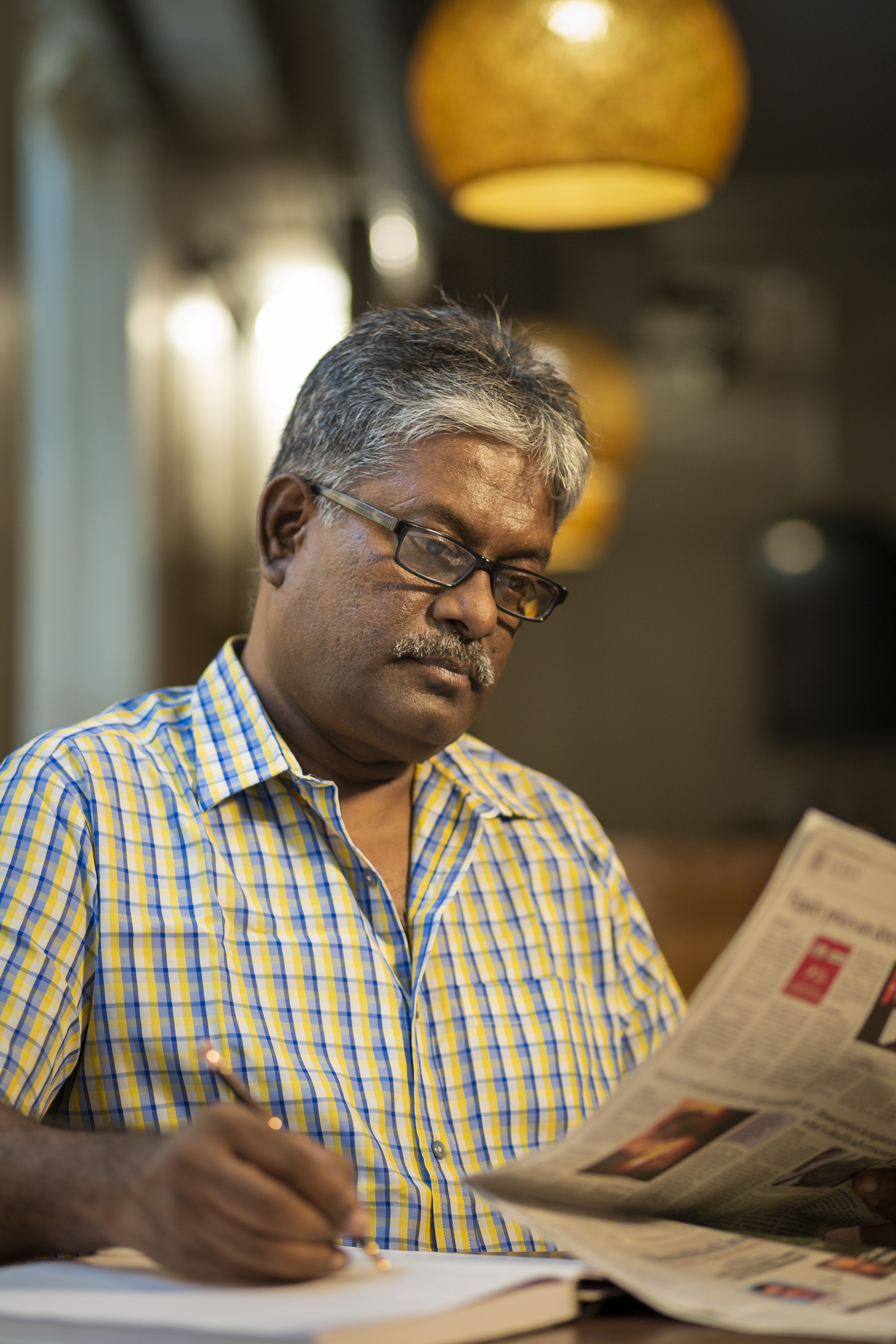
Ravisubramaniyan

Ravisubramaniyan (ரவிசுப்பிரமணியன்) is a writer, poet and documentary film maker.

== Life ==
Hailing from Kumbakonam of Thanjavur district, Tamil Nadu he now lives in Chennai. He completed B.A., (1980–83) in Government College, Kumbakonam. His books include articles and poems.

== Books ==
- Compilation of poems - Oppanai Mukangal (Tamil: ஒப்பனை முகங்கள் (கவிதைத்தொகுப்பு), Annam Publishers, Sivagangai, 1990
- Compilation of poems - Waiting (Tamil: காத்திருப்பு (கவிதைத்தொகுப்பு), Annam Publishers, Sivagangai, 1995
- Letters of Vannadasan (Compilation of Kalyanji's letters) (Tamil: வண்ணதாசன் கடிதங்கள், (கல்யாண்ஜியின் கடிதங்கள் தொகுப்பு), Nanjappan Publishers, Coimbatore, 1997
- Compilation of poems - Kalathitha Idaiveliyil (Tamil: காலாதீத இடைவெளியில், (கவிதைத்தொகுப்பு), Mathi Nilayam, Chennai, 2000
- Compilation of poems - Sembalil Aruntiya Nanju (Tamil: சீம்பாலில் அருந்திய நஞ்சு (கவிதைத் தொகுப்பு), Sandhya Publishers, Chennai, 2006
- Alumaigal and Tharunangal (Tamil: ஆளுமைகள் தருணங்கள்), Kalacchuvadu, Nagercoil, 2014
- Compilation of poems - Vithanathu Cithiram (Tamil: விதானத்துச் சித்திரம் (கவிதைத் தொகுப்பு) Bodhivanam Publishers, Chennai, 2017
- That was a different season, (Selected poetry of Ravisubramaniyan, English Translation R.Rajagopalan), Authors Press,
- Ninaivin Alizyil alayum kayalkal(Tamil: நினைவின் ஆழியில் அலையும் கயல்கள்)

== Documentaries ==
For TV channels he has made more than 100 documentaries. He also made the following documentaries on important Tamil scholars:

- Indira Parthasarathy (Tamil: இந்திரா பார்த்தசாரதி எனும் நவீன நாடகக் கலைஞன்)
- M.Renganathan (Tamil: மா. அரங்கநாதனும் கொஞ்சம் கவிதைகளும்)
- Jayakanthan (Tamil: எல்லைகளை விஸ்தரித்த எழுத்துக் கலைஞன்-ஜெயகாந்தன்)
- T. N. Ramachandran (Tamil: சைவத் தமிழ் வளர்க்கும் சேக்கிழார் அடிப்பொடி தி. ந. இராமச்சந்திரன்)
- Thiruloga Seetharam (Tamil: திருலோகம் என்றொரு கவி ஆளுமை)
- He is selected by Kavidalaya for making documentary on K. Balachander, to be released on 9 July 2020, the 90th birthday of the veteran Indian filmmaker.
- Thamarai (Tamil: தாமரை)

== Articles ==
Some of his articles on Tamil scholars include the following:

- Dhenuga (Tamil: தேனுகா) தேனுகா கட்டுரை
- M.V.Venkatraman (Tamil: எம். வி. வி)எம். வி. வி கட்டுரை
- Karicchankunju (Tamil: கரிச்சான்குஞ்சு)கரிச்சான்குஞ்சு கட்டுரை
- S. V. Sahasranamam (Tamil: சகஸ்ரநாமம்)சகஸ்ரநாமம் கட்டுரை
