= Tamil Nadu State Film Award for Best Dialogue Writer =

Indian film award

The Tamil Nadu State Film Award for Best Dialogue Writer is given by the state government as part of its annual Tamil Nadu State Film Awards for Tamil-language (Kollywood) films.

== The list ==
Here is a list of the award winners and the films for which they won.

Year	Storywriter	Film
2015	R. Saravanan	Kaththukkutti
2014	Velraj	Velaiyilla Pattathari
2013	Atlee	Raja Rani
2012	M. Anbazhagan	Saattai
2011	Pandiraj	Marina
2010	A. Sargunam	Kalavani
2009	Pandiraj	Pasanga
2008	M. Karunanidhi	Uliyin Osai
2007	Balaji Sakthivel	Kalloori
2006	Seeman	Thambi
2005	Vedham Puthithu Kannan	Amirtham
2004	Prasanna Kumar	M. Kumaran Son Of Mahalakshmi
2003	Thenmozhi	Eera Nilam
2002	A. R. Murugadoss	Ramana
2001	Shajakhan	Punnagai Desam
2000	Cheran	Vetri Kodi Kattu
1999	Sivaram Gandhi	Anandha Poongatre
1998	Bharathi	Marumalarchi
1997	Velu Prabhakaran	Kadavul
1996	Vikraman	Poove Unakkaga
1995	K. S. Adhiyaman	Thotta Chinungi
1994	Balakumaran	Kaadhalan
1993	R. C. Sakthi	Pathini Penn
1992	Panju Arunachalam	Pandiyan
1991	Erode Soundar	Cheran Pandiyan
1990	P. Vasu	Nadigan
1989	P. Kalaimani	En Purushanthaan Enakku Mattumthaan
1988	M. S. Madhu	Illam
1987		
1986		
1985		
1984		
1983		
1982	Panju Arunachalam	Enkeyo Ketta Kural
1981	Visu	Keezh Vaanam Sivakkum
1980	Valampuri Somanathan	Thunaivi
1979	K. Bhagyaraj	Puthiya Vaarpugal
1978	K. Balachander	Thappu Thalangal
1977	Thooyavan	Balaparitchai
1976		
1975		
1974		
1973		
1972		
1971		
1970	Vietnam Veedu Sundaram	Vietnam Veedu
1969	Sornam	Nam Naadu
1968	K. Balachander	Ethir Neechal, Thamarai Nenjam

== See also ==
- Tamil cinema
- Cinema of India
