= Kanuri Ranjith Kumar =

- Born: 24 March 1938; Kowtharam, Krishna District, Andhra Pradesh
- Died: June 11, 1984 (aged 46)
- Occupation: Producer

Kanuri Ranjith Kumar ( 24 March 1938 – 11 June 1984) was an Indian film producer.

== Filmography ==
- Cheekati Velugulu (1975)
- Mana Voori Katha (1976)
- Maa Iddari Katha (1977)
- Naalaaga Endaro (1978) (as presenter; won—Nandi Award for Best Feature Film - Gold)
- Tholi Kodi Koosindi (1981)
- Chattaniki Veikallu (1983)
- Lanke Bindelu (1983)

== Awards ==
- Nandi Award for Second Best Feature Film - Silver - Tholi Kodi Koosindi (1981)
