= Varumayin Niram Sivappu =

1980 film by K. Balachander

- Theatrical release poster of Tamil version
- Directed by: K. Balachander
- Written by: K. Balachandar
- Produced by: R. Venkataraman
- Starring: Kamal Haasan; Sridevi; Pratap Pothen; R. Dilip; S. Ve. Shekher
- Cinematography: B. S. Lokanath
- Edited by: N. R. Kittu
- Music by: M. S. Viswanathan
- Production company: Premalaya Pictures
- Release dates: 6 November 1980 (Tamil); 9 January 1981 (Telugu)
- Running time: 141 minutes
- Country: India
- Languages: Tamil; Telugu

Varumaiyin Niram Sivappu (transl. The colour of poverty is red) is a 1980 Indian satirical drama film written and directed by K. Balachander. It was simultaneously shot in Tamil and Telugu, with the latter version titled Aakali Rajyam (transl. Kingdom of hunger). The film stars Kamal Haasan and Sridevi, with Pratap Pothen, R. Dilip and S. Ve. Shekher in supporting roles. It revolves around a group of three men in Delhi struggling with poverty and unemployment.

Varumayin Niram Sivappu was released on 6 November 1980, and Aakali Rajyam on 9 January 1981. Varumayin Niram Sivappu was a commercial success, winning two Filmfare Awards South and three Tamil Nadu State Film Awards. It was remade in Hindi as Zara Si Zindagi (1983) with Haasan reprising his role, and Balachander again directing.

== Plot ==
Unemployed man Rangan and another man share a rented house in Delhi, both are Tamils (Telugus in Telugu version). Another Tamil (Telugu in Telugu version), Thambu, subsequently joins them for the purpose of searching for a job. Rangan is a straightforward person who does not tolerate anything which involves impersonation and deceit. Hence, he cannot secure any job which tests his attitude and patience. The three share everything they get to eat and suffer from poverty and hunger on most days. Rangan meets Devi and offers to carry her luggage until the railway station. On reaching there, she offers to pay him, to which Rangan replies that he has no change. Devi rebukes him, assuming he is trying to cheat her. Angered, Rangan leaves without accepting the money.

Rangan once chases a man to his house to get back the money which he had looted by lying to him, and stumbles upon Devi. The man is Devi's father, who lost all his money betting on horse racing, and now earns a living by cheating the people around him to get money for betting more. He cheated Rangan by saying that his daughter had died and needed money to perform the last rites. Devi returns the money to Rangan, and she also pays him for carrying her luggage before. Devi and Rangan get to know each other better, learning that Rangan is an unemployed, straightforward person and Devi is a small-time stage actress. Devi goes to Rangan's house to introduce him to her stage play director, so he can replace an ill actor and earn some money. She suggests he finish his lunch before going there, leaving Rangan embarrassed, as there is no food to eat. However, he and his roommates pretend to eat a sumptuous meal inside the kitchen. But Devi finds out that Rangan and his roommates hardly eat for real. Hence, she spends her own money to provide food for them. When they are about to eat, Devi's grandmother dies, and they cannot eat the food.

Rangan's roommate (named Appu in Telugu) somehow earns some money, which he claims he did so by the advice of a certain Dilip. Thambu is very eager to know Dilip and wants to earn money in his own way. He runs away from home in search of Dilip. Devi introduces Rangan to a director, Pratap, who is arrogant and short-tempered. Rangan cannot act at his direction as he feels the scenes are logically incorrect. He apologises to Devi for letting her down. Rangan explains that his attitude is inherited from his father, Carnatic vocalist Sundaram Pillai (Venkata Ramanayya Panthulu in Telugu), who always scolds him for his inability to find a job on his own. Rangan once sold his father's tanpura to buy a train ticket for Delhi, which angered his father. Rangan decides to leave home for a while so that the problem between him and his father might subside. Rangan once beats a mute roadside artist, Barani, for watching him and Devi secretly. In fact, he did so to draw a portrait of them. Rangan apologises to him, and both Devi and Rangan become his friends.

Pratap is obsessed with Devi, and he cannot tolerate her closeness with Rangan. Devi once expressed to Barani that she loves Rangan, but is scared to tell him, as he might get angry at her. Rangan hears this and he expresses his intentions in the form of a song that he loves her. Pratap tries to strangle Devi on the stage for a play instead of acting. Off-stage, he tells her that he loves her madly and immediately wants to marry her. Devi quits acting and starts living at Rangan's house, taking on a new job as a babysitter. Devi loses the baby while shopping for a toy for the child and is fired. But the baby was actually kidnapped by Rangan's roommate to demand money from its parents. Rangan beats him and asks for Dilip, to which he confesses that "Dilip" is an identity he made up. Rangan tells him to leave the house and never return.

Rangan loses all of his jobs due to his straightforwardness and subsequently suffers from poverty, but he is not ready to back off from his attitude for the sake of hunger. Hence, he tells Devi to choose a better life as he has lost all his confidence in making a decent living with her. Pratap threatens to commit suicide if Devi does not marry him. Hence, Devi decides to accept his proposal on the condition that Pratap must recommend a job for Rangan to his father, to which Pratap reluctantly agrees. But Rangan gets angry on seeing Devi with Prathap and goes away. Barani dies in a road accident while seeking Rangan. Devi finds Rangan and tells him that he is the one she loves and she will not leave him ever, which angers Pratap, and he goes away. Rangan's father comes to Delhi to find his son and meets him as a barber. Rangan explains that he feels satisfied with the job as he does not have to cheat, impersonate or fake his life for anything. The story ends with Rangan and Devi starting a fresh life, and Sundaram Pillai (Venkata Ramanayya Panthulu in Telugu) accepting his son's decision. Rangan's former roommate is now the husband of a rich, older widow, and Thambu has become a mentally ill beggar due to his search for the non-existent Dilip.

== Cast ==
- Kamal Haasan as S. Rangan (Tamil) / J. Ranga Rao (Telugu)
- Sridevi as Devi
- Pratap Pothen as Pratap
- R. Dilip as "Dilip" (Tamil) (Note: The character's true name is never revealed in the Tamil version, only the false identity "Dilip".) / Appu (Telugu)
- S. Ve. Shekher as Thambu
- Bharani as Bharani
- Poornam Viswanathan as Needamangalam Sundaram Pillai (Tamil)
- J. V. Ramana Murthi as Jonnalagadda Venkata Ramanayya Panthulu (Telugu)
- Oru Viral Krishna Rao as Devi's father
- Prathapachandran as Pratap's father
- Jayasri as Rangan's mother
- Thengai Srinivasan as Rangan's saloon customer (uncredited) (Tamil)

== Production ==
Pratap Pothen was cast in the role of an eccentric director "with an unhealthy obsession for an actress." He also revealed that director K. Balachander insisted that he dub in his own voice. S. Ve. Shekher who debuted in Balachander's Ninaithale Inikkum (1979) and newcomer R. Dilip were cast in the role of Kamal Haasan's roommates. Bharani, a poster designer for Balachander's films, joined the film as a mute artist at Balachander's request. The film was simultaneously shot in Telugu as Aakali Rajyam. Filming took place primarily in Delhi.

== Themes ==
Varumayin Niram Sivappu, a satire on the unemployment crisis India was facing in the 1980s, revolves around the themes of unemployment and poverty in India, particularly for graduates. It also criticises "factional politics" as the root cause behind both problems. The character Rangan's anger towards the system's failure to provide employment and decent living for its people is conveyed when he recites poems by Subramania Bharati. Writing for Jump Cut, Kumuthan Maderya viewed Varumayin Niram Sivappu as belonging to the "angry young man" genre: one that rebels against establishment. The film also criticises bureaucracy, nepotism and red tape as major causes for unemployment and poverty in the country. Sujatha Narayanan, writing for The New Indian Express, noted its similarities to Nenjirukkum Varai (1967).

== Soundtrack ==
The soundtrack was composed by M. S. Viswanathan and lyrics were written by Kannadasan for Tamil and by Acharya Aatreya for Telugu. The Tamil version includes two songs written by Subramania Bharati. The song "Nalladhor Veenai" is based on Tilang raga. The song "Tu Hai Raja" is predominantly in Hindi, save for the last few lines which are in Tamil and Telugu in their respective versions.

Tamil
No.	Title	Lyrics	Singer(s)	Length
1.	"Sippi Irukkuthu"	Kannadasan	S. P. Balasubrahmanyam, S. Janaki	5:04
2.	"Theerthakkarayinile"	Subramania Bharati	S. P. Balasubrahmanyam	2:34
3.	"Ranga Rangaiah"	Kannadasan	P. Susheela	3:04
4.	"Nalladhor Veenai Seidhe"	Subramania Bharati	S. P. Balasubrahmanyam	3:39
5.	"Paattu Onnu Paadu Thambi"	Kannadasan	S. P. Balasubrahmanyam	4:38
6.	"Tu Hai Raja"	P. B. Sreenivas	S. Janaki	3:56
Total length:				22:55

Telugu
No.	Title	Lyrics	Singer(s)	Length
1.	"Kanne Pillavani"	Aatreya	S. P. Balasubrahmanyam, S. Janaki	5:04
2.	"O Mahatma O Maharshi"	Sri Sri	S. P. Balasubrahmanyam	2:34
3.	"Gussa Rangayya"	Aatreya	P. Susheela	3:04
4.	"Kooti Kosam Kooli Kosam"	Sri Sri	S. P. Balasubrahmanyam	3:39
5.	"Saapaattu Yetuledu Paataina Paadu"	Aatreya	S. P. Balasubrahmanyam	4:38
6.	"Tu Hai Raja"	P. B. Sreenivas	S. Janaki	3:56
Total length:				22:55

== Release and reception ==
Varumayin Niram Sivappu was released on 6 November 1980 alongside Nizhalgal with both films having similar themes of unemployment. Aakali Rajyam was released on 9 January 1981. Writing for Kalki, Santhanam criticised the title for lacking relevance to the story, felt the story lacked depth, but praised the performances of Haasan, Sridevi, Pratap and Sekar, though he felt the climax seemed rushed. Naagai Dharuman of Anna praised the acting of the cast, Viswanathan's music, Loknath's cinematography, the dialogues and direction. A critic from Ananda Vikatan positively reviewed the film, giving it a score of A, equal to more than 50 out of 100. The film was a commercial success in both languages, with the Tamil version running for over 100 days in theatres. Prasad of Zamin Ryot appreciated the Telugu version for addressing the ills of society, a genre that was rare in that respective industry.

== Accolades ==
At the 28th Filmfare Awards South, Varumayin Niram Sivappu won the Filmfare Award for Best Film – Tamil, Balachander won Best Director – Tamil, and Haasan won Best Actor – Telugu for acting in Aakali Rajyam. Varumayin Niram Sivappu also won the Tamil Nadu State Film Awards for Best Film, Best Director (Balachander) and Best Actor (Haasan).

== Legacy ==
Varumayin Niram Sivappu became a trendsetter in Tamil cinema. Pratap recalled in January 2015 that it was the simultaneous release of Moodu Pani (another film featuring him) and Varumayin Niram Sivappu that made him a star. However, both Moodu Pani – which depicted Pothen as a psychopath who murders prostitutes – and Varumayin Niram Sivappu led to him being typecast in similar roles. "Both roles caught the public imagination, and I admit I cashed in when I was offered similar stuff. Now, unless I'm offered an unreasonable amount of money, I doubt I'll accept these roles," he said in a 2014 interview.

== Bibliography ==
- Dhananjayan, G. (2011). The Best of Tamil Cinema, 1931 to 2010: 1977–2010. Galatta Media. OCLC 733724281.
- Nayak, Satyarth (2019). Sridevi: The Eternal Screen Goddess. India: Penguin Random House. ISBN 9789353056780.
