= Nool Veli =

- Theatrical release poster in Tamil
- Directed by: K. Balachander
- Screenplay by: K. Balachander
- Story by: Sharief
- Produced by: P. R. Govindarajan; J. Doraswamy
- Starring: Sarath Babu; Sujatha; Saritha
- Cinematography: B. S. Lokanath
- Edited by: N. R. Kittu
- Music by: M. S. Viswanathan
- Production company: Kalakendra Movies
- Release dates: 7 September 1979 (Tamil); 2 November 1979 (Telugu)
- Running time: 128 minutes
- Country: India
- Languages: Tamil; Telugu

Nool Veli (/veɪli/ transl. Fence of Yarn) is a 1979 Indian Tamil-language drama film directed by K. Balachander starring Sarath Babu, Sujatha and Saritha in prominent roles. It was made simultaneously in Telugu as Guppedu Manasu (transl. Fist-sized heart), and is a remake of the 1977 Malayalam film Aa Nimisham. Kamal Haasan does a guest role in both Tamil and Telugu versions. Nool Veli was released on 7 September 1979, and Guppedu Manasu on 2 November the same year.

== Plot ==
Buchi Babu, an architect, his wife Vidya, a writer, and their young daughter, move in next door to Srimati, an out of work actress who is living with her teenage daughter Baby. Vidya also works at the Andhra Pradesh Film Censor Board.

The two families become good neighbours. Baby, who is very playful and naughty visits the new neighbours very often. The neighbours have a lot of fun together playing games and going to the beach. There is a slight hint of inappropriate behaviour by Buchi and Baby at the beach, but that is dismissed as she calls him Uncle. Vidya's brother who is a house surgeon in Osmania General hospital, comes to visit them, and falls in love with Baby.

A film producer comes to talk to Vidya, for permission to use one of her novels for his movie and offers her substantial money. She refuses saying that the adaptation will not be in line with her story and will do injustice to her ideal characters. While at her house, the producer sees Srimati, and asks Buchi if she is the veteran actress Srimati. He then approaches her and decides to cast her in a movie starring Kamal Haasan, as the mother of a lead character. She agrees, but on the set she realises that she has lost her acting skills. With a heavy heart she goes to bed that night, and dies in her sleep. Vidya decides to bring up Srimati's daughter Baby, as her own daughter. Baby moves in with Vidya and her family.

Baby finishes school, and is sent to study in a hostel. Buchi Babu meets with an accident in his car, but escapes with minor injuries. His servant Tirupati phones Baby and tells her about the accident. Worried about Buchi, she immediately takes a taxi home, which breaks down at a distance from her home. She runs from there in the rain, and gets wet. She feels assured after seeing that it's just a minor injury. Buchi asks her to dry herself and change since she is wet. As Baby goes in to change behind a curtain, the wind blows away the curtain, and Buchi looks at her undressed. He is tempted toward Baby. He stands next to her and holds her hand and sees that she reciprocates the attraction.

Meanwhile, at the Film Censor Board, a director presents her a movie where a man marries his adopted daughter in a twist in the climax. She is disgusted with the idea and objects to the incestuous content. After work, she gets her little daughter from school, and as she opens the door of her house, she finds her husband and Baby in bed together.

Although disgusted with what has happened, she tries to be ideal, like the characters in her novels. She tries to restore normalcy in the house by ignoring the incident. They all have dinner together and she seems to deal with it quite maturely. Later that night, she tells her husband that its ok, and that she understands the situation. A bit relieved, Buchi touches her hand to show her affection. At this point, she can no longer control her disgust and she pushes him away. She tells him that she thought she could be ideal, but is not. At the core, she is just an ordinary woman, who needs fidelity, and she sleeps on the floor henceforth, away from her husband, refusing to share the bed.

She then calls up the Film Censor Board and withdraws her previous objections saying that far worse things happen in the real world, and there is no need to hide the truth.

A few weeks later, Vidya finds out that Baby is pregnant and has decided to keep the child. Vidya approaches her dad, for advice, telling him the entire story. He doesn't have any solution. Vidya thinks about it a lot, and decides to ask her brother to marry Baby and asks him to visit. Meanwhile, she talks to Baby and finds out that not only is Baby pregnant, but also she is attracted to her husband. When Mouli tells that he will marry her in spite of anything, Vidya scolds him, saying that he is just like any other man, thinking of women as a piece of meat. Mouli is hurt, and takes a vow of celibacy, and leaves.

Vidya talks to her husband and he is very non-cooperative, and out of anger, that he is being repeatedly questioned, says that he is a man, and he will do as he wants. Vidya storms out with her daughter, and soon after, Baby leaves to Hyderabad and delivers a daughter who she names Vidya.

In the climax, they get together on the terrace of a 9-storey building, and she makes peace between them all and commits suicide.

== Cast ==
- Sujatha as Vidya
- Sarath Babu as Buchi Babu
- Saritha as Baby
- G. V. Narayana Rao as Mouli
- J. V. Ramana Murthy as Vidya's father

Guest appearances

- Kamal Haasan
- S. V. Venkatraman as himself

== Production ==
The shadow hand art which appeared in the films' title credits was done by Radhakrishnan.

== Soundtrack ==
Soundtrack was composed by M. S. Viswanathan. For the Tamil version, Kannadasan wrote the lyrics, and for the Telugu version, Acharya Aatreya did. The song "Mounathil Vilayadum" is set in Sama, a Carnatic raga, and "Therottam Anandha Shenbaga Poovvattam" is set to Bowli.

Tamil
No.	Title	Singer(s)	Length
1.	"Naana Paadhuvadhu Naana"	S. P. Balasubrahmanyam, Vani Jairam, L. R. Anjali
2.	"Therottam Anandha Shenbaga Poovvattam"	S. P. Balasubrahmanyam
3.	"Veenai Sirippil Asai Anaippil"	S. P. Balasubrahmanyam, Vani Jairam
4.	"Mounathil Vilaiyadum Manasakshiye"	M. Balamuralikrishna

Telugu
No.	Title	Singer(s)	Length
1.	"Kanne Valapu Kannela Pilupu"	S. P. Balasubrahmanyam, Vani Jairam
2.	"Mouname Nee Basha O Mooga Manasa"	M. Balamuralikrishna
3.	"Nenaa Paadanaa Paata Meera Annadi Maata"	Vani Jairam, S. P. Balasubrahmanyam
4.	"Nuvvena Sampangi Puvvuna Nuvvena"	S. P. Balasubrahmanyam

== Release and reception ==
Nool Veli was released on 7 September 1979, and Guppedu Manasu on 2 November that year. Reviewing the former for Kalki, Kutty Krishnan wrote if not for the acting performances of Saritha and Sujatha, this film would have been a huge yawn. Naagai Dharuman of Anna praised acting, music, screenplay and direction.

== Bibliography ==
- Sundararaman (2007) [2005]. Raga Chintamani: A Guide to Carnatic Ragas Through Tamil Film Music (2nd ed.). Pichhamal Chintamani. OCLC 295034757.
