= Tholi Kodi Koosindi =

- Theatrical release poster of the Telugu version
- Directed by: K. Balachander
- Written by: K. Balachander
- Produced by: Kanuri Ranjith Kumar
- Starring: Saritha; Seema; Madhavi; Sarath Babu; Jeeva
- Cinematography: B. S. Lokanath
- Music by: M. S. Viswanathan
- Production company: Sri Ranjith Arts
- Release date: 6 February 1981
- Country: India
- Languages: Telugu; Tamil

Tholi Kodi Koosindi (transl. The morning rooster crows) is a 1981 Indian Telugu-language drama film directed by K. Balachander, starring Saritha, Seema, Madhavi, Sarath Babu and Jeeva. The film was simultaneously made in Tamil as Enga Ooru Kannagi (transl. Kannagi, from our village), with the same lead cast. Both versions were released on 6 February 1981. The Telugu version won three Nandi Awards.

== Cast ==
=== Telugu version ===
- Sarath Babu as Venkata Swamy, a police constable
- Saritha
- Seema as Devudamma
- Madhavi as Jabilli
- Jeeva as Rampandu Dora
- Prasanna
- Hanumanthu
- Shantaram
- Dhulipala Seetarama Sastry
- Jayasri
- Satti Babu
- Prasad Babu

=== Tamil version ===
The lead cast was retained for the Tamil version with a slightly altered supporting cast.

- Major Sundarrajan
- Srikanth

== Production ==
The film was prominently shot at Veerabhadra Temple, Pattiseema. The filming was also held at Godavari.

== Soundtrack ==
The songs were composed by M. S. Viswanathan and the lyrics were penned by Acharya Aatreya.

Telugu
No.	Title	Singer(s)	Length
1.	"Andamaina Lokamani"	S. Janaki
2.	"Eppudo Edo Chuchi"	S. P. Balasubrahmanyam, P. Susheela
3.	"Kudirinda Rogam"	S. Janaki
4.	"Olammi Madivelammi"	L. R. Eswari
5.	"Police Venakatasaami"	S. P. Balasubrahmanyam

Tamil
No.	Title	Singer(s)	Length
1.	"Pachaivayal"	S. Janaki
2.	"Ithaithaan"	S. P. Balasubrahmanyam, P. Susheela

== Reception ==
Reviewing the Tamil version for Kalki, Nalini Sastry was critical of the film and said Balachandar, who went three steps up, slipped two steps.

== Accolades ==
Tholi Kodi Koosindi won three Nandi Awards: Second Best Feature Film – Silver, Best Audiographer (V. Sivaram) and Best Lyricist (Aatreya).
