= Sollathaan Ninaikkiren =

1973 film by K. Balachander

- Poster
- Directed by: K. Balachander
- Screenplay by: K. Balachander
- Based on: Ilavu Kaatha Kili by Manian
- Produced by: Manian 'Vidhwan' Ve. Lakshmanan
- Starring: S. V. Subbaiah; Sivakumar; Kamal Haasan; Jayachitra; Srividya; Shubha; Jayasudha
- Cinematography: B. S. Lokanath
- Edited by: N. R. Kittu
- Music by: M. S. Viswanathan
- Production company: Udhayam Productions
- Release date: 7 December 1973
- Running time: 148 minutes
- Country: India
- Language: Tamil

Sollathaan Ninaikkiren (transl. I Am Trying to Say...) is a 1973 Indian Tamil-language film, written and directed by K. Balachander. Starring S. V. Subbaiah, Sivakumar, Kamal Haasan, Jayachitra, Srividya, Shubha and Jayasudha, it is based on the novel Ilavu Kaatha Kili by Manian. The film was released on 7 December 1973. It was remade in Telugu as Ammayilu Jagratha. Balachander remade the film in Kannada as Sundara Swapnagalu.

== Plot ==
Raghavan arrives at the office to assume his role as manager, only to find Sivaraman—a mentally unstable former head clerk and widower—occupying the position. Alarmed by the situation, the staff call Sivaraman's daughter, Manjula, a schoolteacher, who gently escorts her father back home. Meanwhile, Kamal, a wealthy but idle womanizer, reconnects with his old friend Raghavan at a local club. Raghavan invites him to visit sometime, though Kamal's intentions seem more self-indulgent than cordial.

On New Year's Day, a noticeably steadier Sivaraman, returns to the office and invites Raghavan for a festive lunch at his home. Though Manjula and her sister Kamala doubt he will show up, they lovingly prepare an elaborate meal. Raghavan, who lives with a cook who cares for his motherless child, decides to accept the invitation—and during the visit, he meets the youngest of Sivaraman’s daughters, Pushpa.

In Raghavan’s absence, Kamal exploits the opportunity by bringing a woman from the club into Raghavan’s home. Displeased by this breach of trust, Raghavan decides to rent part of his house to Sivaraman’s family, offering them a safe and dignified place to stay.

As time passes, both Manjula and Kamala quietly fall for Raghavan. One day, Raghavan offers to post a letter Kamala wrote to a friend and reads it, discovering her affection. However, his own feelings lean toward Pushpa. Pushpa, in turn, realizes her sister Kamala loves Raghavan. At college, Pushpa sees Kamal’s poor treatment of women—especially her friend who was discarded by him. Kamal also influences his younger brother to drink, prompting Pushpa to intervene. In doing so, she learns his identity and confronts Kamal. He shamelessly reveals a list of women he hopes to seduce—Pushpa among them. Outraged, she vows never to fulfill his fantasy.

At home, worry grows as Pushpa returns late, prompting Manjula and Kamala to accuse their father of neglect. Sivaraman confesses his helplessness due to unemployment and lack of savings. Raghavan steps in, promising to find suitable grooms for the daughters, starting with Manjula. Unfortunately, she realizes her love for him is one-sided. Pushpa later confronts Kamal’s mother, who misjudges her intentions and offers money to make amends for her son’s misconduct. Two marriage prospects visit Manjula’s home—both reject her. One man, Kathiresan (an acquaintance of Raghavan), prefers Kamala instead. Around this time, Manjula discovers that Raghavan’s cook is the father of the child she’s been helping.

Pushpa comforts her friend Sudha, who is forced to marry a much older man, Prabhu. At the wedding, Kamal leers at Sudha, and later attempts to seduce her during a visit to her home. He entices Prabhu with his luxury car, and while Prabhu is away for a test drive, Kamal makes a move on Sudha. One evening, Kamala stumbles into Raghavan’s room and discovers a portrait he painted—of Pushpa. Heartbroken, she confronts him, and he confesses his feelings. Kamala, through her own pain, encourages him to speak up, and accepts Kathiresan’s marriage proposal.

Kamal and Sudha plot to elope, but Prabhu overhears. He begs Pushpa to stop them. She races to Kamal’s home, arriving before he leaves for the airport. Kamal, still obsessed with Pushpa, tries to seduce her, but she cleverly halts time—literally stopping the clock—to prevent his escape. On Pushpa’s birthday, Raghavan plans to propose, but the recent chaos leaves him hesitant. Kamala asks him to consider marrying Manjula instead. Raghavan approaches her, but she declines—haunted by his past connection with the cook. Yet, while caring for the cook’s child, she begins to admire his character. She suggests marriage, but the cook refuses, feeling too poor and unworthy. Later, when he returns a lost purse, Manjula symbolically wears widow’s clothing—revealing her own sense of societal invisibility. Moved, the cook agrees to marry her.

In the end, Sivaraman is reinstated in his job thanks to Raghavan, who himself receives a transfer to another city, closing a chapter filled with love, heartbreak, redemption, and quiet transformations.

== Cast ==
- S. V. Subbaiah as Sivaraman
- Sivakumar as Raghavan
- Kamal Haasan as Kamal
- Jayachitra as Pushpa
- Srividya as Kamala
- Shubha as Manjula
- Jayasudha as Sudha
- Poornam Viswanathan as Sudha's husband, Prabhu
- Master Sekhar as Kamal's brother

== Production ==
Sollathaan Ninaikkiren is based on the novel Ilavu Kaatha Kili by Manian. The novel had been performed over 100 times as a stage play. The novel was later made into a film by Manian and 'Vidhwan' Ve. Lakshmanan under the production banner Udhayam Productions. The film was launched at Gemini Studios. S. S. Balan clapped the board while M. G. Ramachandran switched on the camera. Thangappan Master was initially hired as the dance choreographer, but as K. Balachander objected to whom Kamal Haasan called "the traditional cinema dance master", and wanted a younger man, Haasan hired Raghuram. Haasan worked as an assistant director of this film. The final length of the film was 4,589.68 metres (15,058.0 ft). The song "Kalyanam Kacheri" was shot at Gemini Studios.

== Soundtrack ==
The music was composed by M. S. Viswanathan, with lyrics by Vaali. The title song is based on Keeravani raga.

Song	Singers	Length
"Kalyanam Kachari"	S. P. Balasubrahmanyam, L. R. Eswari	03:32
"Malar Pol Sirrppathu"	Vani Jairam	04:27
"Pallavi Endru"	P. Susheela, S. Janaki	05:06
"Sollathaan Ninaikkiren"	M. S. Viswanathan, S. Janaki	03:13
"Sollathaan Ninaikkiren" (Sad)	M. S. Viswanathan	02:00

== Release and reception ==
Sollathaan Ninaikkiren was released on 7 December 1973. Ananda Vikatan, in a review dated 30 December 1973, positively reviewed the film for Balachander's writing and the cast performances. Kanthan of Kalki also gave the film a positive review. Navamani praised the acting, dialogues and direction. The film was remade in Telugu as Ammayilu Jagratha. Balachander remade the film in Kannada as Sundara Swapnagalu.

== Legacy ==
The title of the film inspired a television series of same name, produced by K. Balachander for Zee Tamil.
