= Achamillai Achamillai =

- Theatrical release poster
- Directed by: K. Balachander
- Written by: K. Balachander
- Produced by: Rajam Balachander; Pushpa Kandaswamy
- Starring: Rajesh; Saritha
- Cinematography: B. S. Lokanath
- Edited by: N. R. Kittu
- Music by: V. S. Narasimhan
- Production company: Kavithalayaa Productions
- Release date: 18 May 1984
- Running time: 161 minutes
- Country: India
- Language: Tamil

Achamillai Achamillai (transl. No fear, no fear) is a 1984 Indian Tamil-language political drama film written and directed by K. Balachander. The film stars Rajesh and Saritha, with Pavithra, Jeyagopi, Delhi Ganesh, Charle and Delhi Nayakar in supporting roles. It revolves around a selfless idealist whose morality declines when he takes to politics, alienating his wife in the process.

Achamillai Achamillai was released on 18 May 1984 and received critical acclaim. It won three awards at the 32nd Filmfare Awards South, as well as the National Film Award for Best Feature Film in Tamil. The film's title refers to a poem written by Subramania Bharati.

== Plot ==
Thenmozhi is a textile factory worker in a village. She develops a liking for Ulaganathan, an idealist in the same village who is respected for his integrity and selflessness. With the approval of Ulaganathan's father Brahmanayagam, Ulaganathan and Thenmozhi marry on 15 August, India's Independence Day. The couple lead a happy life and work for the welfare of the village.

Members from the Yellow political party want Ulaganathan to join them. At first he declines, but they lure him by promising to provide him with a ministerial post if the party wins. Thenmozhi becomes upset with the developments as she notices a significant change in Ulaganathan's attitude. She argues with him frequently about this, but he is unfazed. When Thenmozhi becomes pregnant, she goes to her visually impaired father's home for delivering the child.

By the time Thenmozhi returns with their son, Ulaganathan has left the Yellow party to join the opposing Purple party, the result of party switching. He also shifts to a new house gifted by the Purple party. Thenmozhi, who is unable to accept his lack of loyalty, futilely argues with him. He orders her to remain completely obedient to him without arguing or advising. The rift between them becomes wider when Thenmozhi refuses to satisfy Ulaganathan's sexual desires, citing his lack of loyalty.

Alangaram, who previously wanted to marry Ulaganathan, becomes his mistress and Ulaganathan neglects Thenmozhi. Alangaram and her mother slowly take control over the household, with Brahmanayagam powerless. Thenmozhi's brother Suthanthiram, who had run away in childhood, returns and fights for his sister's rights, but fails as he is bribed into silence by Ulaganathan. All of this causes Thenmozhi to leave with her child to her father's home. While she is not home, the child which was left in her father's care, takes his first steps, and is washed away in a flood. Ulaganathan arranges for his father-in-law's eye surgery, and Thenmozhi becomes isolated with everyone supporting Ulaganathan.

With Ulaganathan's party having become weaker, he is advised by the party chief to recruit more members to make the party stronger. Ulaganathan plans to organise a communal riot in the village to lure people to his side. Alangaram overhears this, tells Thenmozhi, but drowns in quicksand when escaping Ulaganathan's henchmen. Thenmozhi asks Ulaganathan to end his atrocities and surrender. But he mocks her and advises her to join him for the upcoming Independence Day ceremony, which is also their wedding anniversary.

The next day, Thenmozhi comes to the ceremony, where a statue of Mahatma Gandhi is to be unveiled by Ulaganathan, with a large garland of flowers and garlands him. As Ulaganathan expresses happiness about his wife's apparent return to his side, she takes a knife hidden in the garland and stabs him to death. The police arrest Thenmozhi and Suthanthiram sombrely sits under the Gandhi statue.

== Cast ==
- Rajesh as Ulaganathan
- Saritha as Thenmozhi
- Pavithra as Alangaram
- Ahalaya as Sudali
- Delhi Ganesh as Brahmanayagam
- Delhi Nayakar as Suthanthiram (credited as Prabhakar)
- Charle as Patchi (Petchiappan)
- Jeyagopi as Palavesam
- Vairam Krishnamoorthy
- Veeraiah
- Radha Ravi as a henchman (uncredited)

== Production ==
The film was produced by Kavithalayaa Productions, Balachander's production house. Apart from direction, he took charge of the story, screenplay, and dialogue. Cinematography and editing were handled by B. S. Lokanath and N. R. Kittu, respectively. The song "Odukira Thanniyila" was shot at a waterfall in Courtallam and most of the scenes were shot in places near Courtallam.

== Themes and analysis ==
Achamillai Achamillai is a satire on the Indian political system. Its underlying theme is party switching, a common phenomenon that exists in the country's political system, and its impact on small-time politicians. Balachander added a dwarf character named Suthanthiram (transl. Freedom) to metaphorically depict that the freedom of the nation is stunted.

== Soundtrack ==
The soundtrack was composed by debutante V. S. Narasimhan. He claimed he had been recommended to Balachander by Ilaiyaraaja. The songs "Aavaram Poovu" and "Odukira Thanniyila" attained popularity. According to Erode Tamilanban, the song "Kaiyila Kaasu" for which he wrote lyrics was banned by radio stations as it was too political in nature.

Track listing
No.	Title	Lyrics	Singers	Length
1.	"Aavaram Poovu"	Vairamuthu	S. P. Balasubrahmanyam, P. Susheela
2.	"Karisal Tharisu"	Erode Tamilanban	Vani Jairam
3.	"Kaiyila Kaasu"	Erode Tamilanban	S. P. Balasubrahmanyam
4.	"Odukira Thanniyila"	Vairamuthu	Malaysia Vasudevan, P. Susheela
5.	"Pudhiru Poda"	Vairamuthu	Malaysia Vasudevan, S. Janaki

== Release and reception ==
Achamillai Achamillai was released on 18 May 1984 to critical acclaim. The film had a 100-day run in theatres and was commercially successful. It was the only Tamil film to be screened at the 'Indian Panorama' 10th International Film Festival of India in 1985. A contemporary review from Ananda Vikatan stated that while everyone at the time was using cinema for entertainment, Balachander used it as a weapon to attack the evils of the society. Jayamanmadhan of Kalki praised the acting of the star cast, Narasimhan's music and Balachander's direction. The film received criticism for showcasing violence. Some critics were concerned about the idea that even educated people would be corrupted if they come to politics, while a few others opined that the film did not provide a solution for the problem.

== Accolades ==
Year	Event	Category	Nominee	Outcome	Ref.
1984	32nd National Film Awards	Best Feature Film in Tamil	V. Natarajan (Producer); K. Balachander (Director)	Won	
1984	32nd Filmfare Awards South	Best Film – Tamil	V. Natarajan	Won	
1984	32nd Filmfare Awards South	Best Director – Tamil	K. Balachander	Won	
1984	32nd Filmfare Awards South	Best Actress – Tamil	Saritha	Won	

== Legacy ==
Achamillai Achamillai is widely regarded as one of the finest that Balachander has directed. In a 2006 interview with The Hindu, Balachander listed the film as one of his favourites. G. Dhananjayan, in his 2011 book The Best of Tamil Cinema: 1977 to 2010, called the film a bold attempt by K. Balachander after Thanneer Thanneer (1981), and lauded the director for his dialogue filled with sarcasm. Analysing the dominance of female characters in Balachander's films, Baradwaj Rangan listed the heroine of Achamillai Achamillai as an example.

== Sources ==
- Banerjee, Shampa; Srivastava, Anil (1988). One Hundred Indian Feature Films: An Annotated Filmography. Taylor & Francis. ISBN 978-0-8240-9483-6.
- Dhananjayan, G. (2011). The Best of Tamil Cinema, 1931 to 2010: 1977–2010. Galatta Media. OCLC 733724281.
- Rajadhyaksha, Ashish; Willemen, Paul (1998) [1994]. Encyclopaedia of Indian Cinema. British Film Institute and Oxford University Press. ISBN 0-19-563579-5.
