= Ek Duuje Ke Liye =

- Poster
- Directed by: K. Balachander
- Written by: K. Balachander (original story & screenplay); Inder Raj Anand (dialogues)
- Based on: Maro Charitra (Telugu)
- Produced by: L. V. Prasad
- Starring: Kamal Haasan; Rati Agnihotri; Madhavi
- Cinematography: B. S. Lokanath
- Edited by: N. R. Kittoo
- Music by: Laxmikant–Pyarelal
- Distributed by: Prasad Productions Pvt. Ltd
- Release date: 5 June 1981
- Running time: 163 minutes
- Country: India
- Language: Hindi
- Budget: ₹50 lakh (US$53,000)
- Box office: ₹10 crore (US$1.1 million)

Ek Duuje Ke Liye (transl. Made For Each Other) is a 1981 Indian Hindi romantic tragedy film directed by K. Balachander. A remake of Balachander's Telugu film Maro Charitra, it stars Kamal Haasan, in his Bollywood debut and Rati Agnihotri as a pair of lovers from different families who oppose their relationship, and go to dire lengths to break them apart. It features Madhavi and Rakesh Bedi in supporting roles.

Ek Duuje Ke Liye was released on 5 June 1981, and grossed over ₹10 crore (US$1.1 million) at the box office, making it one of the highest-grossing Indian films of its year. It received positive reviews from critics, who praised the film's score—particularly the single "Tere Mere Beech Mein" sung by S. P. Balasubrahmanyam and penned by Anand Bakshi—and the performances of the cast. At the 28th National Film Awards, it won Best Male Playback Singer (S. P. Balasubrahmanyam). At the 29th Filmfare Awards, it received a leading 13 nominations—including Best Film—of which it won three awards: Best Lyricist (Bakshi), Best Screenplay (Balachander) and Best Editing.

Ek Duuje Ke Liye is regarded as a "classic film" in Hindi cinema, and one of the best Hindi-language films of all time. It has inspired several Indian and Western actors and singers, such as Britney Spears, who notably sampled instruments from "Tere Mere Beech Main" for her 2004 single "Toxic".

== Plot ==
The movie is about the love between a Tamil man, Vasu (Kamal Haasan), and a North Indian woman, Sapna (Rati Agnihotri), who are neighbors in Goa. They come from totally different backgrounds and can hardly speak the other's language. When Vasu and Sapna admit their love, there is chaos in their homes as they face an unexpected test of their love.

The movie begins with an old, ruined building near the beautiful beach of Goa. The dilapidated walls of the building are covered with many names, but two names stand apart from the rest---Vasu and Sapna.

Vasu is a happy, carefree young man who belongs to a Tamil family. He resigns his job after his boss scolds him and he returns to his home in Goa. His orthodox Tamilian father is always at loggerheads with the Hindi-speaking neighbour family. The family has a beautiful daughter named Sapna, a college student.

While being followed on her way home by a creepy bookstore clerk (who'd earlier shown her a book of nude photos), Sapna sees Vasu jogging and starts a one-way conversation with him. Seeing this, the bookstore clerk retreats. Sapna thanks Vasu for pretending to be her friend, but he reveals that he doesn't understand Hindi. Vasu wants to make friends with her. He tries to meet her later pretending his motorcycle has broken down but he crashes and ends up in the hospital. Impressed, Sapna sends him a gift: a ceremonial mask with her name on it and asks his name.

Despite the nasty conflicts between their families, Vasu and Sapna fall deeply in love with each other. They get to know each other, experiencing the joy and innocence of first love. One day, however, Sapna fairly misunderstands Vasu when he forcefully kisses her and is offended and breaks up with him. Despite Vasu's efforts to make her understand his love, Sapna ignores him and remains angry. A week later, Sapna finds Vasu awake all night looking at her window hoping that she would forgive him. Heartbroken at seeing him like that, Sapna forgives him and signals him by turning her room light off and on repeatedly.

They meet the next day and Sapna expresses her love for Vasu by kissing his hand. The lovers unite and visit the beaches, forts, waterfalls and scenic places of Goa. While returning home late at night, Vasu's motorcycle runs out of petrol. They pose as a newly married couple and ask for a lift in a car. To their shock, Sapna's father is in the car and he takes her home immediately. Vasu and Sapna keep meeting each other and fall in love even more.

One day when Sapna returns from college after meeting Vasu, she finds the lewd bookstore clerk at her home. The man has secretly clicked pictures of her and Vasu together and shown them to her parents. Burning with rage, Sapna's mother forbids her from seeing Vasu and accompanies her everywhere. Heartbroken, Vasu makes a plan and stealthily meets Sapna during her college lunch break. They go to a hotel for lunch and Vasu pauses the elevator halfway to spend some time with Sapna. He sings a love song for her using his broken Hindi. This leads to an amused crowd at the hotel lift listening in. They are reprimanded by the guard as they exit.

Vasu and Sapna's families find out. In anger, they lock up Sapna at home and Vasu's father scolds him. Despite the opposition, Vasu boldly goes and meets Sapna in her home in the presence of her parents and expresses his love for her. Sapna's mother screams and claims that Vasu is ruining their family's honor.

Finally, both the families meet and Vasu and Sapna affirm their love for each other. Their families agree to allow them to marry on one condition – that they separate from each other for one year without any contact or communication. Afterwards, if they still want to be together, they can get married. Vasu and Sapna reluctantly agree to the contract.

Vasu goes to Hyderabad for a job, while Sapna stays behind in Goa. During their year of separation, Vasu writes a letter every day to Sapna, in which he expresses his pain and love, but doesn't send it to her because of the contract. He learns to speak Hindi fluently from a young widow named Sandhya. To drown his pain of separation, he also learns classical dance from Sandhya.

On the other hand, Sapna visits all the places where she and Vasu used to go which brings back old memories. She also visits a rocky hill by the beach, where their names 'Vasu' and 'Sapna' are painted on the highest rock. In order to make Sapna forget Vasu, her mother destroys the cassette tape that he had given her. The mother also burns her only photo of Vasu which Sapna crumbles into her tea and drinks in defiance. In response, Sapna writes Vasu's name on every inch of her bedroom wall, making her family even more angry.

Sapna goes on a college trip to Mangalore, where her mother sends her cousin Chakram to spy on her. Chakram wants to marry Sapna, but she doesn't like him. Coincidentally, Vasu also comes to Mangalore due to a job assignment. He spots Sapna and follows her to her hotel room, but bumps into Chakram, who lies that he and Sapna are married. A shocked Vasu meets Sapna's college friends and asks about her, but they mistakenly say Chakram and Sapna are soon to be married.

Vasu is heartbroken and proposes to Sandhya, thinking that Sapna was unfaithful to him. Sandhya is surprised but accepts and fixes their wedding date. Later she finds in his room all the letters he wrote to Sapna, and discovers the truth. Sandhya goes to Goa and meets Sapna and learns that she is not married and is still waiting for Vasu. Seeing their true love, Sandhya sacrifices her love and decides to unite Vasu and Sapna.

She tells the truth to Vasu and cancels their wedding, urging him to go to his beloved Sapna as their one-year contract was completed. Sandhya's older brother hears that the wedding is cancelled and thinks that Vasu abandoned his sister. In a drunken, angry state, he phones his criminal friend in Goa and asks him to 'completely get rid' of Vasu.

When Vasu arrives back in Goa, and is about to meet Sapna in their favorite beach spot, Sandhya's older brother's criminal friend and a gang brutally beat up Vasu. Meanwhile, Sapna is heading to the beach to meet Vasu. The lascivious bookstore clerk tries to attack her, Sapna tries to escape him and falls from the second floor. The bookstore clerk seeing her almost dead from the fall, still violently rapes her! Sapna and Vasu meet after the clerk and the goons flee. However, Vasu is badly injured. Distraught, feeling they can't live without each other, they join hands and leap off the cliff together, a symbol of doomed love.

== Cast ==
- Kamal Haasan as Vasudevan "Vasu"
- Rati Agnihotri as Sapna
- Madhavi as Sandhya
- Raza Murad as Danny
- Rakesh Bedi as Chakram
- Poornam Viswanathan as Vasudevan's Father
- Satyen Kappu as Jagannath
- Shubha Khote as Mrs. Kundanlal
- Asrani as Hari
- Arvind Deshpande as Kundanlal
- Avtar Gill as Vikas
- Sunil Thapa as Librarian

== Production ==
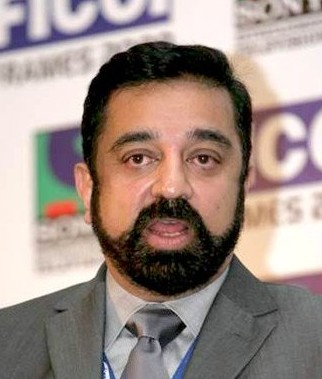
Kamal Haasan (left) and Madhavi were cast in the film after appearing in Balachander's previous work Maro Charitra (1978)

The production team had earlier thought of titling it Ek Aur Itihas, but it went on to become Ek Duuje Ke Liye. Leading man Kamal Haasan and supporting heroine Madhavi were cast in the film after appearing in director K. Balachander's previous Telugu film Maro Charitra (1978), which Ek Duuje Ke Liye was based on. The leading actress Rati Agnihotri was relatively unknown at the time, and did not appear in Maro Charitra.

== Music ==
The music was composed by Laxmikant–Pyarelal and the lyrics were written by Anand Bakshi. It was the first Hindi film for South Indian singer S. P. Balasubrahmanyam; the composers were initially against including him, feeling that the "Madrasi" would not do justice to a Hindi composition, but Balachander cited that if the lead character played by Haasan could not speak Hindi well, then even if Balasubrahmanyam blemished the song, it would "capture the character." Two portions of "Tere Mere Beech Mein" were later sampled in the 2004 Britney Spears song "Toxic" as part of its hook.

Song	Singer	Raga
"Tere Mere Beech"	S. P. Balasubrahmanyam	Shivaranjani
"Mere Jeevan Saathi Pyar Kiye Jaa"	Anuradha Paudwal, S. P. Balasubrahmanyam	
"Hum Tum Dono Jab Mil Jayenge"	Lata Mangeshkar, S. P. Balasubrahmanyam	
"Tere Mere Beech Mein Kaisa Hai" (Duet)	Lata Mangeshkar, S. P. Balasubrahmanyam	
"Hum Bane Tum Bane Ek Duuje Ke Liye"	Lata Mangeshkar, S. P. Balasubrahmanyam	
"Solah Baras Ki"	Lata Mangeshkar, Anup Jalota	Ahir Bhairav

== Release ==
Ek Duuje Ke Liye was released on 5 June 1981. In 2015, Ek Duuje Ke Liye was screened at the Habitat Film Festival. It grossed over ₹100 million (US$1.1 million) at the box office, which made it one of the highest-grossing Indian films of 1981.

Ek Duje Ke Liye received acclaim from critics, who especially lauded the performances of Kamal Haasan and Madhavi, as well as the performance of newcomer Agnihotri, who achieved her breakthrough in the role. Additionally praised was the film's score, and the single "Tere Mere Beech Mein", which was sung by S. P. Balasubrahmanyam and written by Anand Bakshi, was singled out for acclaim.

=== Accolades ===
29th National Film Awards:

- Best Male Playback Singer – S. P. Balasubrahmanyam for "Tere Mere Beech Mein"

29th Filmfare Awards:

- Best Lyricist – Anand Bakshi for "Tere Mere Beech Mein" (Won)
- Best Screenplay – K. Balachander (Won)
- Best Editing – N. R. Kitoo (Won)
- Best Film – L. V. Prasad (Nominated)
- Best Director – K. Balachander (Nominated)
- Best Actor – Kamal Haasan (Nominated)
- Best Actress – Rati Agnihotri (Nominated)
- Best Supporting Actress – Madhavi (Nominated)
- Best Comedian – Asrani (Nominated)
- Best Music Director – Laxmikant–Pyarelal (Nominated)
- Best Lyricist – Anand Bakshi for "Solah Baras Ki Bali Umar" (Nominated)
- Best Male Playback Singer – S. P. Balasubrahmanyam for "Tere Mere Beech Mein" (Nominated)
- Best Story – K. Balachander (Nominated)
