= Ninaithale Inikkum (1979 film) =

1979 film by K. Balachander

- Theatrical release poster in Tamil
- Directed by: K. Balachander
- Screenplay by: K. Balachander
- Story by: Sujatha
- Produced by: R. Venkataraman
- Starring: Kamal Haasan; Rajinikanth; Jaya Prada; Geetha
- Cinematography: B. S. Lokanath
- Edited by: N. R. Kittu
- Music by: M. S. Viswanathan
- Production company: Premalaya Productions
- Release dates: 14 April 1979 (Tamil); 19 April 1979 (Telugu)
- Running time: 141 minutes
- Country: India
- Languages: Tamil; Telugu

Ninaithale Inikkum (transl. Sweet memories; lit. 'It's sweet to think about') is a 1979 Indian Tamil-language film directed by K. Balachander starring Kamal Haasan, Rajinikanth, Jaya Prada and Geetha. The screenplay is based on a story written by Sujatha. The film was also simultaneously shot in Telugu as Andamaina Anubhavam (transl. Beautiful experience). A large part of the film was shot in Singapore. The film was later dubbed in Hindi as Pyara Tarana.

== Plot ==
Sona, the daughter of a Singapore businessman misses her money and other valuables during her visit to India. A smuggler comes forward to help her and assigns her a smuggling related job. Hence Sona pretends to be a fan of singer Chandru and meets him in a hotel. She keeps a diamond inside Chandru's guitar and leaves the room. On the next day, Chandru's troupe leaves for Singapore. Coincidentally, Chandru forgot to take that particular guitar with him. Sona also travels in the same flight and becomes closer to Chandru. Even though her intention was to get the diamond from Chandru, she starts loving Chandru. However she hesitates in conveying her love since she knows that her early death due to blood cancer is inevitable. The smuggler tortures her since the diamond was lost. Due to her circumstances, she is unable to keep her words and Chandru thinks that Sona is a cheat and fraud. Chandru's troupe returns to India. The smuggler feels pity for Sona and allows her to leave for India. Sona enters Chandru's house to Chandru's surprise. Chandru realizes that Sona is not a cheat and fraud. In spite of his mother's opposition and her terminal illness, Chandru marries Sona. Sona spends her remaining short life along with Chandru's troupe. Finally Sona passes away and Chandru decides to be a widower throughout his life.

== Cast ==
- Kamal Haasan as Chandru
- Rajinikanth as Deepak
- Jaya Prada as Sona
- Jayasudha as Kamini (Guest appearance)
- Sarath Babu (Guest appearance)
- G. V. Narayana Rao (Guest appearance)
- Geetha as Meena
- Misro as Kamalakar Rao/Mama
- Rajappa
- Srinivas
- S. Ve. Shekher as the radio operator (uncredited)
- Poornam Viswanathan as Sona's father (uncredited)

== Production ==
Many of K. Balachander's students like Jayasudha, Sarath Babu, Geetha and Narayana Rao appear in cameo for their mentor. This was the debut film for actor S. Ve. Shekher. Jayasudha's sister Subhashini also appears. The band in the film and the music were inspired by the Beatles.

A large portion of the film was shot in Singapore, while additional scenes were shot at the AVM Garden Villa, Chennai. The scene where Deepak (Rajinikanth) is challenged to flip his cigarette 10 times or lose a finger is based on Roald Dahl's Man from the South.

== Soundtrack ==
The soundtrack was composed by M. S. Viswanathan while the Tamil lyrics were written by Kannadasan. The audio was launched at Mayilai Rajeswari Marriage Hall. Unlike other LP records of that time where songs run for shorter runtime, LP record of this soundtrack had all the songs playing in the single LP which comes under 45 LP.

The disco song "Engeyum Eppothum" was remixed by Yogi B in Pollathavan (2007). The song "Sambo Siva Sambo" was remixed by Vijay Antony as "Avala Nambithan" for Salim (2014). Sudha Ragunathan noted that "Ninaithale Inikkum just rocked the scene with MSV Sir bringing out his innovative streaks."

Tamil
No.	Title	Lyrics	Singer(s)	Length
1.	"Namma Ooru Singari"	Kannadasan	S. P. Balasubrahmanyam	3:34
2.	"Sayonara Vesham Kalainthathu"	Kannadasan	S. P. Balasubrahmanyam	1:47
3.	"Nizhal Kandavan"	Kannadasan	S. P. Balasubrahmanyam	2:12
4.	"Ninaiththaale Inikkum"	Kannadasan	S. P. Balasubrahmanyam, S. Janaki	3:51
5.	"Vaaniley medai amaithu"	Kannadasan	S. P. Balasubrahmanyam	2:23
6.	"Aananda Thaandavamo"	Kannadasan	L. R. Eswari	5:11
7.	"Bharathi Kannamma"	Kannadasan	S. P. Balasubrahmanyam, Vani Jairam	5:47
8.	"Inimai Nirainda Ulagam"	Kannadasan	S. P. Balasubrahmanyam, L. R. Eswari	5:48
9.	"Kaaththirunthen"	Kannadasan	S. P. Balasubrahmanyam	3:41
10.	"Sambo Sivasambo"	Kannadasan	M. S. Viswanathan	4:48
11.	"Thattiketka Aalillai"	Kannadasan	S. P. Balasubrahmanyam	1:18
12.	"Yaathum Oore"	Kannadasan	S. P. Balasubrahmanyam, P. Susheela	6:39
13.	"Engeyum Eppothum"	Kannadasan	S. P. Balasubrahmanyam	6:31
14.	"You're like a fountain"	Kanmani Subbu	S. P. Balasubrahmanyam	2:09
Total length:				55:39

Telugu
No.	Title	Lyrics	Singer(s)	Length
1.	"Ananda Thandavamo"		L. R. Eswari
2.	"Andamaina Anubhavam"	Aatreya	S. P. Balasubrahmanyam, S. Janaki
3.	"Andamaina Lokamundi"		S. P. Balasubrahmanyam, L. R. Eswari
4.	"Hello Nestam Bagunnava"	Aatreya	S. P. Balasubrahmanyam, P. Susheela
5.	"Kurralloy Kurrallu Verrekki Vunnollu"	Aatreya	S. P. Balasubrahmanyam
6.	"Nuvve Nuvvamma Navvula Puvvamma"	Aatreya	S. P. Balasubrahmanyam, Vani Jairam
7.	"Pada Pada Cheyi Kalipenu"		S. P. Balasubrahmanyam
8.	"Sambho Siva Sambho"		S. P. Balasubrahmanyam
9.	"Singapuri Singari"		S. P. Balasubrahmanyam
10.	"What A Waiting"		S. P. Balasubrahmanyam

== Release and reception ==
Ninaithale Inikkum was released on 14 April 1979, and Andamaina Anubhavam on 19 April. Piousji of Sunday wrote, "despite heroic efforts by [Kamal Haasan] to save the film, it disintegrates fast." P. S. M. of Kalki appreciated performances of Rajinikanth and Haasan, Lokanath's cinematography and Balachander's direction felt Balachander made a film without a strong plot and called it just like that entertaining film. Naagai Dharuman of Anna praised the acting of cast, Lokanath's cinematography, Viswanathan's music and appreciated Balachander's direction for moving things in a light hearted manner then showcasing tragedy without making viewers bored is an innovative way.

== Legacy ==
In 2009, another film called Ninaithale Inikkum was released. Director G. N. R. Kumaravelan stated that the title was "right for my film on students and the college scenario". The line "Jagame Thandhiram" in the song "Sambo Siva Sambo" inspired a 2021 film of the same name.

Abaswaram Ramji conducted a stage show called Ninaithale Inikkum in 2006. A 2014 play called Shiva Sambho named after the song "Sambho Siva Sambho" was conducted by Theatre of Maham. M. S. Viswanathan composed the background music for the play.

== Re-release ==
A digitally restored version of the film was released on 4 October 2013, but received a lukewarm response at the box office.

== Bibliography ==
- Ramachandran, Naman (2014) [2012]. Rajinikanth: The Definitive Biography. New Delhi: Penguin Books. ISBN 978-0-14-342111-5.
