= Edhir Neechal (1968 film) =

1968 film by K. Balachander

- Theatrical release poster
- Directed by: K. Balachander
- Written by: K. Balachander
- Based on: Edhir Neechal by K. Balachander
- Produced by: N. Selvaraj; B. Duraisamy; N. Krishnan
- Starring: Nagesh; Muthuraman; Sundarrajan; Srikanth; M. R. R. Vasu; Sowcar Janaki; Jayanthi
- Cinematography: N. Balakrishnan
- Edited by: N. R. Kittu
- Music by: V. Kumar
- Production company: Kalakendra Movies
- Release date: 12 December 1968
- Running time: 165 minutes
- Country: India
- Language: Tamil

Edhir Neechal (transl. Swimming against the current) is a 1968 Indian Tamil-language comedy drama film written and directed by K. Balachander. The film has an ensemble cast including Nagesh, Muthuraman, Sundarrajan, Srikanth, M. R. R. Vasu, Sowcar Janaki and Jayanthi. It is based on Balachander's play of the same name, itself inspired by Sombhu Mitra's play Kanchanranga. The film was released on 12 December 1968, and became a commercial success, with Balachander winning the Tamil Nadu State Film Award for Best Dialogue Writer. It was remade in Telugu as Sambarala Rambabu (1970) and in Hindi as Lakhon Me Ek (1971).

== Plot ==
Maadhu is a destitute orphan who performs odd jobs in a multi-family tenancy for his living and education. For the services he renders, he's allowed to sleep under the stairs of the tenancy without any rent and is given leftovers. He attends college with the help from one of his college professor while working the nights for supplementary income for books along with certain kind people that share roof in that tenancy he lives. Among few people who understand his situation, and are ready to help are Sabapathy and Nair.

Paaru is a daughter to one of the tenants who returns from Bangalore and whose marriage has been fixed to Kumaresan, one of the tenants living in the house. When, in the marriage hall, one of them recognises Paaru as a person in a mental asylum and when he heard this, Kumerasan says that if Paaru's father pays 15,000 the marriage will happen but Paaru and her family had only 5000. For this reason, Kumerasan rejects her. Maadhu overhears one of the tenants speaking to her husband of getting him married to their daughter Paaru who is said to be psychologically challenged. He forcefully makes his mind to love their daughter even before they propose a marriage, so as to calm himself that the girl is none other than the girl he loved and not some unknown psychologically challenged girl. Then they fall in love and then Maadhu finishes his college studies with lot of obstacles with Nair and Sabapathy helping him inside.

Then one day a rich businessman claims that Maadhu is his long lost son. Hearing this, all the tenants give their gifts but which Nair later reveals that that is a rumor and everyone later takes back the gifts. Paaru reveals that she is the person behind all this and she said that Maadhu has been serving the tenants from the very start if his life and she wanted Maadhu to be served by the tenants. Listening this Kumaresen, who now realizes how intelligent Paaru is, says that he will marry her to which Paaru agrees forcefully and is forced to break her love with Maadhu. She however extracts a promise that he should not marry anyone. In the marriage, Paaru creates a ruckus, and thus stopping the marriage. Maadhu now returns as a rich man and Sabapathy says that he should marry her to which Maadhu replies that he has already married a Punjabi girl. Shocking everyone, he reveals that the girl is none other than his friend Vadivelu and then Paaru and Maadhu marries and thus ending the movie.

== Cast ==
- Nagesh as Maadhu
- Muthuraman as Nair
- Sundarrajan as Sabapathy
- Srikanth as Kittu
- M. R. R. Vasu as Kumaresan
- Sowcar Janaki as Pattu Mami
- Jayanthi as Paaru
- Manorama as Renu
- S. N. Lakshmi
- Thengai Srinivasan (guest appearance)

== Production ==
Edhir Neechal was a play written by K. Balachander, inspired by Sombhu Mitra's play Kanchanranga. Nagesh, who acted in Balachander's play, returned to the film adaptation, which was written and directed by Balachander, and produced by Kalakendra Movies. R. Muthuraman played the Malayali cook Nair, reprising the role originally played by Raman. Balachander considered Sowcar Janaki's role to be "a total contrast" to the melancholic roles she was then known for. Cinematography was handled by N. Balakrishnan, editing by N. R. Kittu and art direction by Ramaswamy.

== Soundtrack ==
The music was composed by V. Kumar, with lyrics by Vaali. The song "Ennamma Ponnamma" was composed by M.S. Viswanathan. The song "Aduthathu Ambujatha Parthela" is set in the Carnatic raga known as Mohanam, and attained popularity. Although P. B. Sreenivas' cinematic career was declining in the late 1960s, B. Kolappan of The Hindu described "Thamarai Kannangal" as "one of his finer numbers during this period."

Song	Singers	Length
"Aduthathu Ambujatha Parthela"	T. M. Soundararajan, P. Susheela	03:30
"Ennamma Ponnamma"	T. M. Soundararajan, P. Susheela	04:05
"Sethi Ketto Sethi"	K. Jamuna Rani, S. C. Krishnan, Y. Swarna, P. Susheela	04:02
"Thamarai Kannangal"	P. B. Sreenivas, P. Susheela	04:11
"Vetri Vendumaa"	Sirkazhi Govindarajan	02:41

== Release and reception ==
Edhir Neechal was released on 12 December 1968. The following week, The Indian Express wrote, "The film, which has a few touching scenes and some interesting twists, is on the whole satisfying", though they criticised the music. Ananda Vikatan, in a review dated 29 December 1968, praised the performances of the cast, particularly Nagesh, Sreekanth and Janaki. C. N. Annadurai, then the chief minister of Tamil Nadu, called the film better than the source play. The film was commercially successful, and Balachander won the Tamil Nadu State Film Award for Best Dialogue Writer.

== Legacy ==
Film historian Mohan Raman considered Edhir Neechal to be one of several films where Balachander established Nagesh, a comedian, as a "serious actor". It was remade in Telugu as Sambarala Rambabu (1970), and in Hindi as Lakhon Me Ek (1971). The characters Pattu Mami and Maadhu became iconic in Tamil cinema. Stage actor Maadhu Balaji adopted the prefix "Maadhu" after the character of the same name.

== Bibliography ==
- Sundararaman (2007) [2005]. Raga Chintamani: A Guide to Carnatic Ragas Through Tamil Film Music (2nd ed.). Pichhamal Chintamani. OCLC 295034757.
