= Maro Charitra =

1978 film by K. Balachander

- Theatrical release poster
- Directed by: K. Balachander
- Written by: K. Balachander
- Produced by: Rama Arangannal
- Starring: Kamal Haasan; Saritha
- Cinematography: B. S. Lokanath
- Edited by: N. R. Kittu
- Music by: M. S. Viswanathan
- Production company: Andal Productions
- Release date: 19 May 1978
- Running time: 169 minutes
- Country: India
- Language: Telugu

Maro Charitra (transl. Another History) is a 1978 Indian Telugu-language romantic tragedy film written and directed by K. Balachander. It stars Kamal Haasan and Saritha in the lead with Madhavi appearing in prominent roles. The film deals with cross-cultural romance between a Tamil man and a Telugu woman. Upon release, it was commercially successful and remains a cult classic. Owing to its success in Andhra Pradesh, the film was released in the neighbouring states of Tamil Nadu and Karnataka without being dubbed into the respective languages. It held the record of being the longest-running Telugu film at theatres in Tamil Nadu and Karnataka. Across theatres it had an uninterrupted theatrical run of 2 1/2 years in Bangalore. The song Ye Theega Poovuno became popular.

Balachander won a Best Director at the Southern Filmfare Awards in 1979. Later in 1981, Balachander remade the film in Hindi as Ek Duuje Ke Liye with Kamal Haasan reprising his role. Saritha, the female lead, was, however, replaced by Punjabi actress Rati Agnihotri. The Hindi remake became a success as well. Both the films were listed among CNN-IBN's 100 greatest Indian films of all time in 2013. This film was also remade in Kannada as Love Story (2005) and remade into a 2010 Telugu film with the same title. Maro Charitra was dubbed in Malayalam as Thirakal Ezhuthiya Kavitha.

== Plot ==
The movie is about the love between a Tamil man, Balaji a.k.a. Baloo, and a Telugu woman, Swapna, who are neighbors in Visakhapatnam. They come from totally different backgrounds and can hardly speak the other's language. When Baloo and Swapna admit their love, there is chaos in their homes as they face an unexpected test of their love.

The movie begins with an old, ruined building near the beautiful beach of Vizag. The dilapidated walls of the building are covered with many names, but two names stand apart from the rest---Baloo and Swapna.

Baloo is a happy, carefree young man who belongs to a Tamil family. He resigns his job after his boss scolds him and he returns to his home in Vizag. His orthodox Tamilian father is always at loggerheads with the Telugu-speaking neighbour family. The family has a beautiful daughter named Swapna, a college student.

While being followed on her way home by a creepy bookstore clerk (who'd earlier shown her a book of nude photos), Swapna sees Baloo jogging and starts a one-way conversation with him. Seeing this, the bookstore clerk retreats. Swapna thanks Baloo for pretending to be her friend, but he reveals that he doesn't understand Telugu. Baloo wants to make friends with her. He tries to meet her later pretending his motorcycle has broken down but he crashes and ends up in the hospital. Impressed, Swapna sends him a gift: a ceremonial mask with her name on it and asking his name.

Despite the nasty conflicts between their families, Baloo and Swapna fall deeply in love with each other. They get to know each other, experiencing the joy and innocence of first love. One day, however, Swapna fairly misunderstands Baloo when he forcefully kisses her and is offended and breaks up with him. Despite Baloo's efforts to make her understand his love, Swapna ignores him and remains angry. A week later, Swapna finds Baloo awake all night looking at her window hoping that she would forgive him. Heartbroken at seeing him like that, Swapna forgives him and signals him by turning her room light off and on repeatedly.

They meet the next day and Swapna expresses her love for Baloo by kissing his hand. The lovers unite and visit the beaches, forts, waterfalls and scenic places of Goa. While returning home late at night, Baloo's motorcycle runs out of petrol. They pose as a newly married couple and ask for a lift in a car. To their shock, Swapna's father is in the car and he takes her home immediately. Baloo and Swapna keep meeting each other and fall in love even more.

One day when Swapna returns from college after meeting Baloo, she finds the lewd bookstore clerk at her home. The man has secretly clicked pictures of her and Baloo together and shown them to her parents. Burning with rage, Swapna's mother forbids her from seeing Baloo and accompanies her everywhere. Heartbroken, Baloo makes a plan and stealthily meets Swapna during her college lunch break. They go to a hotel for lunch and Baloo pauses the elevator halfway to spend some time with Swapna. He sings a love song for her using his broken Telugu. This leads to an amused crowd at the hotel lift listening in. They are reprimanded by the guard as they exit.

Baloo and Swapna's families find out. In anger, they lock up Swapna at home and Baloo's father scolds him. Despite the opposition, Baloo boldly goes and meets Swapna in her home in the presence of her parents and expresses his love for her. Swapna's mother screams and claims that Baloo is ruining their family honor.

Finally, both the families meet and Baloo and Swapna affirm their love for each other. Their families agree to allow them to marry on one condition – that they separate from each other for one year without any contact or communication. Afterwards, if they still want to be together, they can get married. Baloo and Swapna reluctantly agree to the contract.

Baloo goes to Hyderabad for a job, while Swapna stays behind in Vizag. During their year of separation, Baloo writes a letter every day to Swapna, in which he expresses his pain and love, but doesn't send it to her because of the contract. He learns to speak Telugu fluently from a young widow named Sandhya. To drown his pain of separation, he also learns classical dance from Sandhya.

On the other hand, Swapna visits all the places where she and Baloo used to go which brings back old memories. She also visits a rocky hill by the beach, where their names 'Baloo' and 'Swapna' are painted on the highest rock. In order to make Swapna forget Baloo, her mother destroys the cassette tape that he had given her. The mother also burns her only photo of Baloo which Swapna crumbles into her tea and drinks in defiance. In response, Swapna writes Baloo's name on every inch of her bedroom wall, making her family even more angry.

Swapna goes on a college trip to Mangalore, where her mother sends her cousin Chakram to spy on her. Chakram wants to marry Swapna, but she doesn't like him. Coincidentally, Baloo also comes to Mangalore due to a job assignment. He spots Swapna and follows her to her hotel room, but bumps into Chakram, who lies that he and Swapna are married. A shocked Baloo meets Swapna's college friends and asks about her, but they mistakenly say Chakram and Swapna are soon to be married.

Baloo is heartbroken and proposes to Sandhya, thinking that Swapna was unfaithful to him. Sandhya is surprised but accepts and fixes their wedding date. Later she finds in his room all the letters he wrote to Swapna, and discovers the truth. Sandhya goes to Vizag and meets Swapna and learns that she is not married and is still waiting for Baloo. Seeing their true love, Sandhya sacrifices her love and decides to unite Baloo and Swapna.

She tells the truth to Baloo and cancels their wedding, urging him to go to his beloved Swapna as their one-year contract was completed. Sandhya's older brother hears that the wedding is cancelled and thinks that Baloo abandoned his sister. In a drunken, angry state, he phones his criminal friend in Vizag and asks him to 'completely get rid' of Baloo.

When Baloo arrives back in Vizag, and is about to meet Swapna in their favorite beach spot, Sandhya's older brother's criminal friend and a gang brutally beat up Baloo. Meanwhile, Swapna is heading to the beach to meet Baloo. The lascivious bookstore clerk tries to attack her, Swapna tries to escape him and falls from the second floor. The bookstore clerk, seeing her almost dead from the fall, rapes her despite her protests. Swapna and Baloo meet after the clerk and the goons flee. However, Baloo is badly injured. Distraught, feeling they can't live without each other, they join hands and leap off the cliff together, a symbol of doomed love.

== Cast ==
- Kamal Haasan as Balaji S. a.k.a. Baloo
- Saritha as Swapna
- Madhavi as Sandhya
- J. V. Ramana Murthi as Baloo's father
- Kakinada Syamala as Baloo's mother
- P. L. Narayana as K. Venkateswara Rao
- Jaya Vijaya as Kanakam
- S. K. Misro as Pattabhi

== Production ==
=== Development ===
Maro Charitra was directed by K. Balachander. Hassan had requested Balachander to launch him as a lead actor in Telugu cinema after the success of his Tamil-language feature, Manmadha Leelai in Andhra Pradesh. It was made by Balachander with the sole intention of introducing Kamal Haasan as a lead actor in Telugu cinema. Rama Arangannal, who produced Balachander's previous films agreed to produce the film. Balachander approached his favourite screenwriter Ganesh Patro to write the dialogues; Patro was credited for giving a native appeal to Balachander's successful Telugu films.

=== Casting ===
Kamal had entered Telugu cinema through the director's Anthuleni Katha (1976), albeit playing a supporting role. That was followed by a dubbed version of the Tamil film Manmadha Leelai released during the same period. As both the films had a 100-day run at the theatres, Kamal was approached by many Telugu film producers. The actor had to refuse all the offers citing that he wanted to be launched as a lead actor through a film directed by Balachander, his mentor. As Kamal is a Tamil, Balachander characterised his role as a Tamil man who falls in love with a Telugu girl and developed the screenplay. Most of Kamal's dialogues were in Tamil.

Having chosen the male lead, Balachander was on a lookout for a female counterpart. As the film deals with cross-cultural romance, he decided to cast a new actor to play the female lead. To choose the character, he auditioned a number of girls and finally ended up choosing a "dark-skinned girl with big eyes" named Abhilasha, who was in tenth grade. Though the members of the production unit were unsatisfied with her dark complexion and fat physique, Balachander went ahead in finalising her for the role as he felt she had a homely look and was of the right age to fit in the role. Later, she was rechristened Saritha by Balachander himself. In a 2005 interview with The Hindu, she said that she was the 162nd girl to be auditioned for the film, while also noting that she did not even look good in the photographs that was sent to Balachander. Besides the lead actors, Madhavi who made an impact with Thoorpu Padamara was signed up to play an important role in the film. The film was shot mostly in Visakhapatnam and Bheemunipatnam in Andhra Pradesh. Contrary to most of the films that released during the period, Maro Charitra was shot in black and white. The final length of the film was 4,648.51 metres (15,251.0 ft).

== Soundtrack ==
Maro Charitra

Soundtrack album by M. S. Viswanathan
- Released: 1978
- Genre: Feature film soundtrack
- Language: Telugu
- Label: EMI
- Producer: M. S. Viswanathan
External audio
- Audio Jukebox on YouTube

The music and background score was composed by M. S. Viswanathan and lyrics were penned by Aatreya. Randor Guy wrote the English portions of a duet picturised on Kamal and Saritha. The 2015 film Bhale Bhale Magadivoy was named after the song from Maro Charitra.

Telugu Track listing
No.	Title	Lyrics	Singer(s)	Length
1.	"Bhale Bhale Mogadivoi"	Aatreya	S. P. Balasubrahmanyam, L. R. Eswari
2.	"Kalisi Unte Kaladu Sukhamu"	Aatreya	S. P. Balasubrahmanyam, Ramola
3.	"Padaharellaku Neelo Naalo"	Aatreya	S. Janaki
4.	"Vidhi Cheyu Vinthalanni"	Aatreya	Vani Jairam
5.	"Ey Teega Poovuno"	Aatreya	P. Susheela, Kamal Haasan
6.	"Ey Teega Poovuno (pathos)"	Aatreya	S. P. Balasubrahmanyam

Malayalam Track listing
No.	Title	Lyrics	Singer(s)	Length
1.	"Bale Bale Assaami Nee"	Mankombu Gopalakrishnan, Randor Guy	S. P. Balasubrahmanyam, L. R. Eswari
2.	"Hello Darling Nee Ente Lahari"	Mankombu Gopalakrishnan	S. P. Balasubrahmanyam, Ramola
3.	"Pathinezhaam Vayassil"	Mankombu Gopalakrishnan	S. Janaki
4.	"Vidhi kattu neelakandu"	Mankombu Gopalakrishnan	Vani Jairam
5.	"Ariyaatha Pushpavum (Female)"	Mankombu Gopalakrishnan	P. Susheela
6.	"Ariyaatha Pushpavum (Male)"	Mankombu Gopalakrishnan	P. Jayachandran

== Release and reception ==
The film was released on 19 May 1978.

=== Critical response ===
The performances of both the lead actors along with the film's direction won critical acclaim. In 2010, South Scope noted "Maro Charitra once again saw Kamal transform himself, but this time into an out and out urban male ... Kamal let none of them get left out of his wardrobe in the film." In 2013, while Indian cinema was celebrating its 100th anniversary, IBNLive listed out "100 greatest Indian films of all time" where both Maro Charitra and its Hindi remake Ek Duuje Ke Liye were mentioned. In November 2015, Kamal noted, "Visual appeal has always gone hand-in-hand with content, since the days of Chandralekha and [Mayabazar], not just after Baahubali. Maro Charitra had beautiful visuals in black and white." In a 2017 interview with Hindustan Times, Hassan said, "The Maro Charitra heroine, Saritha was simple-looking but a fantastic performer. I liked the music. It challenged us to have good songs in the Hindi remake too."

=== Box office ===
During the first week of release the film performed poorly at the box-office. The film's distributors cited that choosing a dark-skinned girl to play the female lead to be the reason. However, after the second week, the film had a highly successful run in the theatres; it ultimately ended as a box-office success as it ran for 450 days in Andhra Pradesh. Owing to its success in its native state, the producers released the film in the neighbouring territories of Tamil Nadu and Karnataka without dubbing in Tamil and Kannada. Across theatres it had an uninterrupted theatrical run of 2 1/2 years in Bangalore. It ran for 596 days at Safire Theatre in Chennai, 450-day run in Coimbatore at Royal theatre, while had a 693-day run in Bangalore at Kalpana theatre and 350-day run in Mysore at Kayathri theatre. The film was dubbed in Malayalam as Thirakal Ezhuthiya Kavitha and released in 1980.

== Remakes ==
=== Cancelled Tamil remake ===
Balachander considered remaking Maro Charitra in Tamil, but Kamal felt it was pointless to do so since the film already had many Tamil dialogues and was so successful in Madras.

=== Remade in Hindi ===
The film was remade into Hindi as Ek Duuje Ke Liye by Balachander himself in 1981. The film like its original became a box-office success and attained cult status. It also marked the Bollywood debut of many South Indian artists including Kamal Haasan, Madhavi and playback singer S. P. Balasubrahmanyam. In the 1981 film, Balachander chose Rati Agnihotri over Saritha as he conceived that a Punjabi girl would be more suitable to the Hindi audience.

=== Remade in other languages ===
In 2005, the film was remade in Kannada as Love Story (dubbed in Tamil as Uyirullavarai), with a Hindi man and a Kannada woman as the romantic leads. Despite being labelled as a "frame-to-frame remake" of the original, the film was described as "no match to the original film in any aspect of its making" by K. N. Venkatasubba Rao of The Hindu.

=== Remade again in Telugu ===
Five years later, Ravi Yadav remade the story with the same name in Telugu with Varun Sandesh, Anita Galler and Shraddha Das. Unlike the original, the film was a failure and received negative reviews. A review from Rediff.com noted, "the new-age Maro Charitra is no patch on the original".

== Accolades ==
Award	Ceremony	Category	Nominee	Outcome	Ref.
Filmfare Awards South	1979	Best Telugu Director	K. Balachander	Won	

== Legacy ==
Maro Charitra became a landmark in Telugu cinema, and a breakthrough for Saritha and Haasan (in Telugu cinema). In 2017, Kamal Haasan included the film in his list of 70 favourite movies, stating "This was the original for Ek Duje Ke Liye (1981), which was also directed by K Balachander. The Telugu film ran in Chennai for two years. Here the boy was Tamil, the girl Telugu. It was in black and white and I preferred it. The Hindi version was a little flashier when it came to the clothes and so on, it had a Punjabi girl and a Tamil boy. The Maro Charitra heroine (Saritha) was simple-looking but a fantastic performer. I liked the music. It challenged us to have good songs in the Hindi remake too."

== Bibliography ==
- Lal, Ananda (2004). The Oxford companion to Indian theatre. Oxford University Press. ISBN 978-0-19-564446-3.
- Rajadhyaksha, Ashish; Willemen, Paul (1998) [1994]. Encyclopaedia of Indian Cinema. British Film Institute and Oxford University Press. ISBN 0-19-563579-5.
- Ramachandran, T.M. (1982). Film World. Vol. 19.
- Reed, Sir Stanley (1984). The Times of India Directory and Year Book Including Who's who. Bennett, Coleman.
- "Southscope July 2010 – Side A". South Scope. July 2010.
