= Thamarai Nenjam =

1968 film by K. Balachander

- Theatrical release poster
- Directed by: K. Balachander
- Written by: K. Balachander
- Produced by: Annamalai–Arunachalam
- Starring: Gemini Ganesan; B. Saroja Devi; Vanisri
- Cinematography: N. Balakrishnan
- Edited by: N. R. Kittu
- Music by: M. S. Viswanathan
- Production company: Bama Films
- Release date: 31 May 1968
- Running time: 143 minutes
- Country: India
- Language: Tamil

Thamarai Nenjam (/θɑːməraɪ nɛŋdʒəm/ transl. Lotus Heart) is a 1968 Indian Tamil-language romantic drama film written and directed by K. Balachander. The film stars Gemini Ganesan, B. Saroja Devi and Vanisri, with Major Sundarrajan and Nagesh playing supporting roles. It was released on 31 May 1968, and won two Tamil Nadu State Film Awards: Best Film (Third Prize) and Best Dialogue Writer (Balachander). The film was remade in Telugu as Mooga Prema (1971), in Hindi as Haar Jeet (1972) and in Kannada as Mugila Mallige (1985) by Balachander himself.

== Plot ==
Two friends Kamala and Radha fall in love with Murali. Sacrificing her own feelings, Kamala steps aside to help Radha and Murali get together. However, when Radha discovers Kamala's hidden sacrifice, guilt consumes her. She begins pushing Murali back toward Kamala, making life miserable for all three. Later, Kamala serializes their tragic love triangle as a story in a weekly magazine. Upon reading it, Radha learns the full truth, prompting a distraught Kamala to conclude that suicide is the only resolution. Does she succeed?

== Cast ==
- Gemini Ganesan as Murali
- B. Saroja Devi as Kamala
- Vanisri as Radha
- Major Sundarrajan as Vasudevan
- Nagesh as Narayanan
- S. N. Lakshmi as Narayanan's Mother
- Master Prabhakar as prabhakar
- Baby Kausalya as kausalya
- Baby Raji as Raji

== Production ==
C. R. Vijayakumari was offered to act in the film, but did not accept, resulting in B. Saroja Devi replacing her.

== Soundtrack ==
The soundtrack was composed by M. S. Viswanathan and lyrics were written by Kannadasan.

Song	Singer	Length
"Adipodi Paithiyakari"	L. R. Eswari, P. Susheela	3:33
"Mutrukai Porattam"	L. R. Eswari, T. M. Soundararajan	2:53
"Aalayam Enbathu"	P. Susheela	4:29
"Thithikkum Paaleduthu"	P. Susheela	3:33
"Vaanai Maranthu Nindra"	P. Susheela	3:23

== Release and reception ==
Thamarai Nenjam was released on 31 May 1968, and favourably reviewed by Kalki, which praised K. Balachander’s direction and, in particular, Saroja Devi’s performance, noting, "From the beginning till the end, Saroja Devi has proven why she is worthy of the title 'Abhinaya Saraswati". The film won the Tamil Nadu State Film Award for Best Film (Third Prize), and Balachander won the award for Best Dialogue Writer.
