= Thappida Thala =

1978 film by K. Balachander

Thappida Thala Thappu Thalangal
- VCD cover in Kannada
- Directed by: K. Balachander
- Written by: K. Balachander
- Produced by: Kannada: B. A. Ramanujacharya Pandit; B M. Venkatesh; Chandulal Jain; Prasanna Kumar; Tamil: R. Venkataraman
- Starring: Rajinikanth; Saritha
- Cinematography: B. S. Lokanath
- Edited by: N. R. Kittu
- Music by: Vijaya Bhaskar
- Production companies: Lalitha Lakshmi Combines (Kannada); Premaalaya (Tamil)
- Release dates: 6 October 1978 (Kannada); 30 October 1978 (Tamil)
- Running time: 131 minutes
- Country: India
- Languages: Kannada; Tamil

Thappida Thala ( transl. Wrong talas, figuratively "Impractial desires") is a 1978 Indian romantic crime drama film directed by K. Balachander, starring Rajinikanth and Saritha in her film debut. It was simultaneously shot in Kannada and Tamil with the latter version titled as Thappu Thalangal (pronounced [tappu taːɭaŋɡaɭ] transl. Wrong talas). The film was remade in Malayalam as Kazhukan (1979). The film was widely appreciated for the performances of Rajinikanth and Saritha.

== Plot ==
Sarasu is a prostitute and Devu is a hitman. On one of his nightly rounds, Devu is pursued by a cop and seeks refuge at Sarasu's house. They slowly fall in love with each other. Devu's has a rough relationship with his half-brother Soma, who keeps changing his partners and treats them bad.

Devu's assault on a trade union leader delivering medicine to a critically ill worker leads to a mishap. Watching the wailings of the widow of the worker, Devu is traumatised and breaks down at Sarasu's place. In an inspired moment, he suggests they remap their lives and chart a moral course. Sarasu is attracted by the notion of giving up prostitution and leading a normal life as Devu's wife, though she wonders if they'll be able to pull it off.

The couple go to great lengths to secure a job for Devu and lead a normal life, but there are too many skeletons in the closet. Devu is no longer feared for his might, and Sarasu's past clientele continue to haunt her. Sarasu gets a loan for Devu from Soma, who continues to harass her on that pretext. In a particularly traumatic sequence of events, Sarasu is raped by Soma as a helpless Devu watches, pinned down by Soma's henchmen. The couple resolve to repay Soma's loan, and Devu undertakes a botched robbery attempt. Devu is imprisoned and in his absence, Sarasu has an abortion. Soma, however, has a change of heart and tries to meet Devu in jail, but Devu refuses to talk to him.

Devu gets out of jail and finds out his child was stillborn because of Somu raping Sarasu. Sarasu has taken up prostitution again. Enraged, Devu goes to Soma's house and kills him. He then realises Soma is a changed man now and married to one of his previous partners. He gets arrested and on his way to jail, the police see Sarasu fighting with one of her "customers" and they arrest her too.

== Cast ==
- Rajinikanth as Devu
- Saritha as Sarasu
- Sundar Raj as Soma
- Shantaram
- Umesh
- Pramila Joshai as Soma's wife

Uncredited

- Kamal Haasan as Amrit Lal
- R. Sundaramoorthy as Sarasu's customer

== Soundtrack ==
All songs were written by Hunsur Krishnamurthy and Chi. Udayashankar in Kannada and Kannadasan in Tamil, and composed by Vijaya Bhaskar.

Kannada
No.	Title	Singer(s)	Length
1.	"Thappida Thalagalu"	S. P. Balasubrahmanyam
2.	"Yaathara Vichithra Baalu"	S. P. Balasubrahmanyam
3.	"Olavinda Nalle"	Vani Jairam

Tamil
No.	Title	Singer(s)	Length
1.	"Azhagana Ilamangai"	Vani Jairam	3:25
2.	"Ennada Polladha"	S. P. Balasubrahmanyam	3:31
3.	"Thappu Thalangal"	S. P. Balasubrahmanyam	4:44
Total length:			11:40

== Reception ==
While Thappida Thala was a box office success, Thappu Thalangal was an average grosser. Reviewing the latter version, Ananda Vikatan rated the film 52 out of 100. The Hindu wrote that Rajinikanth "departs from his usual gimmicks, and gestures, proving himself to be an actor of great maturity".
