= K. Balachander =

Indian director and writer (1930–2014)

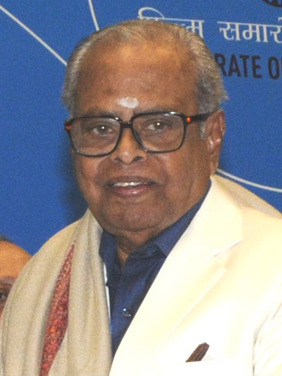
- K. Balachander in 2011
- Born: Kailasam Balachander; 9 July 1930; Nannilam, Madras Presidency, India
- Died: 23 December 2014 (aged 84); Chennai, Tamil Nadu, India
- Occupations: Playwright, film director, film producer, screenwriter, actor
- Years active: 1964–2014
- Works: Full list
- Spouse: Rajam (m. 1956)
- Children: 3, including Bala Kailasam
- Awards: Full list
- Honours: Kalaimamani; Padma Shri; Dadasaheb Phalke Award (2010); ANR National Award

Kailasam Balachander (9 July 1930 – 23 December 2014) was an Indian playwright, film director, producer, screenwriter and actor who worked mainly in the Tamil cinema. He was well known for his distinct film-making style, which tackled unconventional themes and hard-hitting contemporary subject matter. Balachander's films are well known for their portrayal of women as bold personalities and central characters. Popularly referred to as Iyakkunar Sigaram (lit. "Director Paramount"), his films are usually centred on unusual or complicated interpersonal relationships and social themes. He started his film career in 1964 as a screenwriter and graduated to a director with Neerkumizhi (1965).

In a career that spanned 50 years, Balachander wrote or directed 100 feature films, becoming one of the most prolific Indian filmmakers. Known among his colleagues as a tough task master, he was credited with having nurtured numerous actors. In his film career, Balachander had won nine National Film Awards, fourteen Tamil Nadu State Film Awards, five Nandi Awards and thirteen Filmfare Awards. In 1987 he was honored with the Padma Shri, India's fourth highest civilian award, and in 2010 the Dadasaheb Phalke Award, India's highest award in cinema.

Balachander also made films under his production house, Kavithalaya Productions. Apart from Tamil, he made films in other languages such as Telugu, Kannada and Hindi. Towards the tail end of his career, he directed a few TV serials and made a few film appearances as well.

== Early life and background ==
K. Balachander was born in Tamil family in Tanjore district (now Tiruvarur district), India. Balachander stated that, "From my eighth year I've been seeing cinema" and recalls that his earliest interest towards cinema grew after watching films of M. K. Thyagaraja Bhagavathar, then the Superstar of Tamil cinema. At the age of twelve he was drawn to theatre and drama, which eventually helped him develop an interest in acting, writing and directing amateur plays. His obsession towards theatre continued even while doing his graduation (in Zoology) at the Annamalai University, as he regularly took part in stage plays. After completing his graduation in 1949, he started his career as a school teacher in Muthupet, Tiruvarur district. In 1950, he moved to Madras (now Chennai) and joined the Accountant General's office as an apprentice clerk, and during this time he joined "United Amateur Artistes", an amateur drama company. Soon he formed his own troupe and it was during this time he came to prominence as an amateur playwright with Major Chandrakanth, written in English. As the scope of English was highly limited in Madras, he re-wrote the play in Tamil, which ultimately became a "sensation" among the people. Balachander's acting troupe consisted of people from the Tamil film industry such as Major Sundarrajan, Nagesh, Srikanth and Sowcar Janaki. Sunderrajan appeared in over 900 films, Nagesh in over 1,000, Sreekanth in more than 200 films, and Sowcar Janaki appeared in more than 350 films. Other plays written by Balachander include Server Sundaram (Waiter Sundaram), Neerkumizhi (Water Bubble), Mezhuguvarthi (Candle), Naanal (Tall Grass) and Navagraham (Nine Planets). All these produced and directed by him, were received well by the critics.

== Career ==
=== Entry into films: (1964-1969) ===
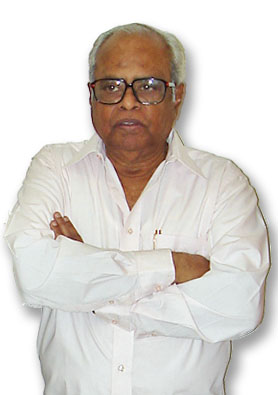
K. Balachander in 2006

Balachander while working in the Accountant General's office, was offered to write the dialogues for the film Dheiva Thaai (1964) by its lead actor M. G. Ramachandran. Balachander was initially reluctant, as he was more theatre-oriented, but on the insistence of his friends he decided to work on the film. By this time he was promoted as a superintendent in his office. Avichi Meiyappa Chettiar acquired the rights of his play Server Sundaram, and decided to make a film based on it. The film dealt with the story of a waiting staff at a restaurant had Nagesh playing the lead. The film was directed by the renowned duo directors, Krishnan–Panju. It won a lot of accolades including the Certificate of Merit for the third Best Feature Film in Tamil and Filmfare Award for Best Tamil Film. During this time another play written and directed by him - Major Chandrakanth was adapted into a film in Hindi as Oonche Log. The film won a National Film Award. Balachander then made his directional debut through Neerkumizhi (1965) which in turn was based on his own play. The film's cast consisted of actors who were a part of Balachander's regular troupe. His following efforts included Naanal, Major Chandrakanth and Ethir Neechal, all based on his own plays. Major Chandrakanth was already filmed in Hindi as Oonche Log the previous year. Major Chandrakanth had Jayalalithaa playing the lead heroine role. In 1967 he made Bama Vijayam, a full-length comedy family drama film. Featuring an ensemble cast, the film was highly successful and remade in Telugu by Balachander himself. The success of both the versions prompted a Hindi remake titled Teen Bahuraniyan, produced by Gemini pictures. In 1968, Balachandar made Thamarai Nenjam, a romantic drama film starring Saroja Devi, Gemini Ganesan and Vanisri, The film won the Tamil Nadu State Film Award for Best Film (Third Prize), and Balachander won the award for Best Dialogue Writer. In 1969, Balachander made Iru Kodugal..

=== Breakthrough and recognition (1970-1980) ===
During the 1970s, Balachander turned indie, making realist movies revolving around family and social issues. In 1971 he made four films.

In 1973, he made Arangetram, which dealt with poverty and prostitution. The film centred on the eldest daughter of a conservative Brahmin household who becomes a prostitute to settle her siblings and support her family. It was ahead of its time in Tamil cinema mainly because of the controversial theme. The film also had Kamal Haasan playing his first major role as an adult actor. The actor would go on to act in 35 films under Balachander. He made his directorial debut in Hindi films with the film Aaina starring Mumtaz and Rajesh Khanna in 1977, which was remake of Arangetram.

The same year, he made Sollathaan Ninaikkiren, based on a novel by Manian. The following year he made Naan Avanillai. He made the film on the insistence of Gemini Ganesan, who also produced and enacted the lead role. It is based on the Marathi play To Mee Navhech, revolved around a man who deceives and marries five women performing nine roles. The film met with commercial failure. However, Gemini Ganesan was adjudged the Best Tamil Actor at the following year's Filmfare Awards ceremony. Following that, Balachander's made Aval Oru Thodar Kathai (1974), his second female-centric film after Arangetram that dealt with the story of a working woman who hails from a middle-class family. Inspired by the 1960 Bengali film Meghe Dhaka Tara, it explored the emotions of a young woman who happens to be the sole earner for her family. He decided to cast an actress who worked as a child actress till then, as his film heroine with the film Mondru Moodichu and gave break to Sridevi. The film Aboorva Raagangal was an original story about an inter-generational romance involving two families. It marked the acting debut of Rajinikanth, who would go on to establish himself as a leading actor.

During this period he made films mostly with Kamal Haasan as the lead actor. In 1976, he made three films: Manmadha Leelai, Anthuleni Katha and Moondru Mudichu. Manmadha Leelai explores the life of a womaniser, played by Kamal Haasan, who gets himself involved in affairs with women. Often considered ahead of its time, it achieved cult status and is considered a "trendsetter" in Tamil cinema. Anthuleni Katha, a Telugu remake of Aval Oru Thodar Kathai had Jaya Prada in her first starring role. received equal acclaim in Andhra Pradesh as in the neighbouring state of Tamil Nadu. Avargal (1977) follows the life of a divorcée as she traverses relationships in reverse, from divorce, to marriage, to falling in love. In 1980, Varumayin Niram Sigappu (1980) was a drama that charts the travails and conflict of being unemployed in a bombastic and harsh city.

=== Bollywood success and Tamil film career (1981-1999) ===
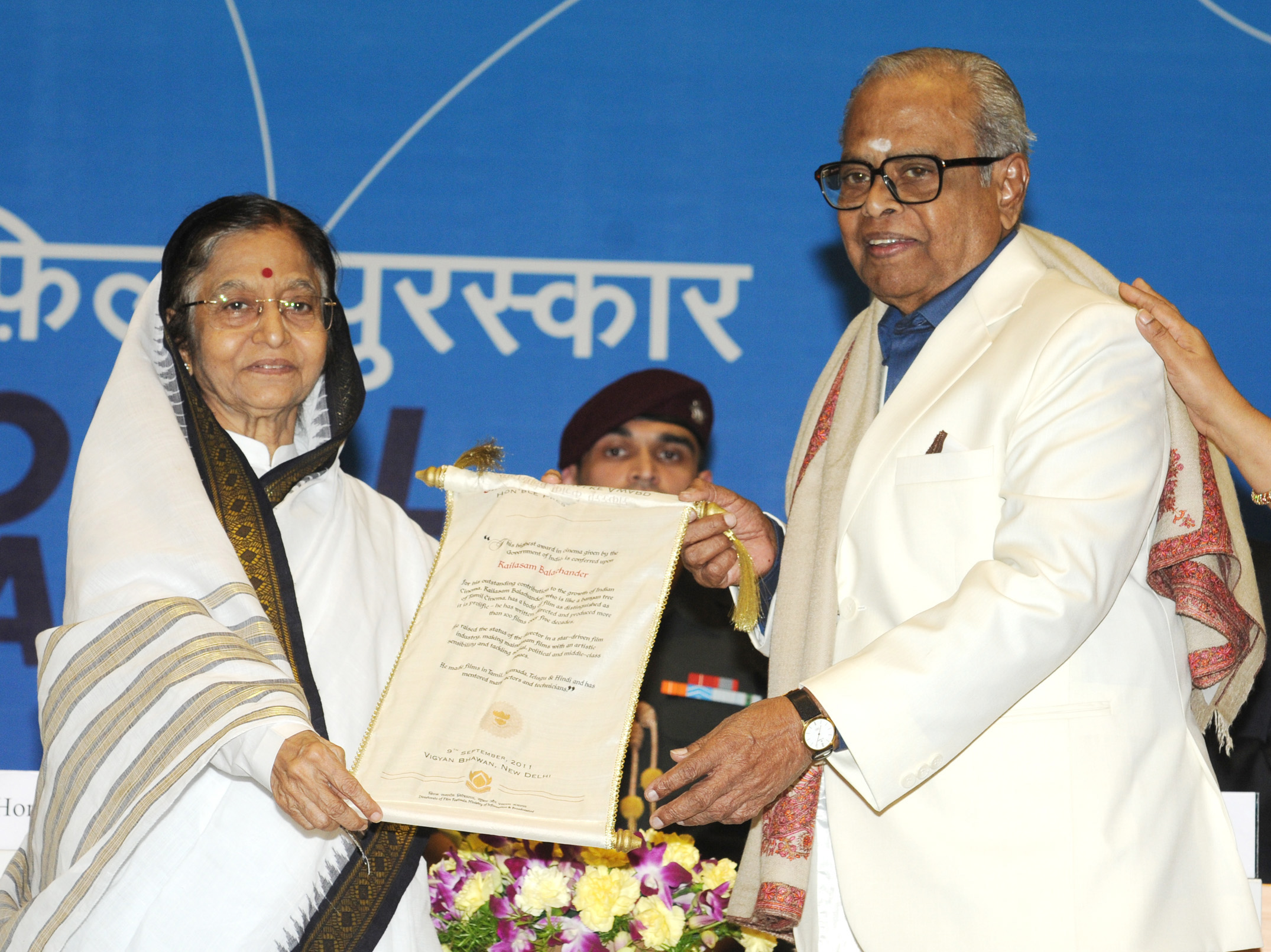
Balachander receiving Dada Sahab Phalke Award from president Pratibha Patil

Balachander re-entered the Hindi film industry after Aaina through Ek Duuje Ke Liye in 1981. He gave Rati Agnihotri her debut Hindi film with Ek Duje Ke Liye. The project was a remake of his own Telugu film Maro Charitra had Kamal Haasan repeating his role as a lead actor. The film marked the Bollywood debut of various artists including Kamal Haasan, Madhavi and S. P. Balasubrahmanyam. Like the original, Ek Duuje Ke Liye emerged as a major box-office success and earned critical acclaim. Balachander received the Filmfare Award for Best Screenplay, apart from two other nominations – for Best Director and Best Story. 47 Natkal (1981) traces the adversities of a newlywed Indian woman living with an scurrilous, expatriate husband in a Parisian suburb.

He made Sindhu Bhairavi (1985), which is about the intellectual collision and subsequent romance between a lofty Carnatic musician and his ardent critic.

The period starting from the late 1980s till the late 1990s saw Balachander venturing into Television and making a number of Television series including Kai Alavu Manasu, Rail Sneham, Ramany vs Ramany(a.k.a. Ramani vs Ramani), Oru Koodai Paasam, Kadhal Pagadai, Premi, Jannal, Kasalavu Nesam, and Anni. Like his earlier films, most of his serials focussed on women, and portrayed them as strong personalities. Kasalvu Nesam was one of his comedy hits, starring Venu Aravind. In 1998, he planned a film titled Thillana Thillana featuring Prashanth, Karthik, Meena and Simran, but the venture failed to develop.

=== Later Years (2000-2014) ===
His later films include Parthale Paravasam (2001) and Poi (2006). he produced Thirumalai (2003), which became a turning point in Vijay's career, making him an action hero.

In 2003, he made Sahana, that touted to be the sequel of his 1985 film Sindhu Bairavi. On venturing into Television, he noted "This medium helps to reach out to the public. That's why I am into making serials".

In 2009, Balachander returned to theatre after a 40-year hiatus through the play Pournami, which had Renuka playing the lead role.

K Balachander's last onscreen role was in Kamal Haasan's Uttama Villain directed by Ramesh Aravind.

== Personal life ==
In 1956, Balachander married Rajam while he was working at the Accountant General's Office. The couple had two sons named Kailasam and Prasanna and a daughter Pushpa Kandaswamy, who is the chairwoman of their production house Kavithalaya Productions. Kailasam was an entrepreneur while Prasanna, a Chartered Accountant, is the managing director and CEO of a leading investment bank in India. Balachander's elder son, Bala Kailasam, died on 15 August 2014 after contracting pneumonia, at the age of 54. He was the head of the television production company Minbinbangal, and delivered memorable series in Tamil includes, Balachandarin Chinnathirai, Kaialavu Manasu, Rail Sneham, and Marma Desam.

== Death ==
Following a neurosurgery in November 2014, Balachander was admitted to Kauvery Hospital in Chennai on 15 December. Reports suggested that he was suffering from fever and from a urinary tract infection, but was recovering well. However, on 23 December 2014 he died due to complications from the urinary infection and other age-related ailments. He was cremated with full state honours the next day.

== Style, critique and public perception ==
Balachander is revered as one of the best directors India has ever produced. His ideas were original and his subjects were complex ideas expressed via art. He is also known for introducing new faces to the film industry. He has introduced over 100 actors in Tamil, Telugu and Kannada languages. Balachander had long associations with some senior artists in the South Indian film industry like Gemini Ganesan, Sowcar Janaki, Nagesh and Muthuraman. Even though he was not the one to discover them, he played a prominent role in shaping their careers.

Kamal Haasan and Rajinikanth, two leading film actors in Tamil cinema, are often referred to as products of Balachander who has paired with each of them or worked with them as a trio in several films during the 1970s. Rajinikanth was chosen by Balachander to play a key supporting character in Apoorva Raagangal (1975) after noting that "there was something special about him". Sridevi, Srividhya, Jayapradha, Jayasudha, Jayachithra, Sujatha, Saritha were notable heroines that were introduced by Balachander. Nassar, Delhi Ganesh, Charlie, Madan Bob were some of the notable supporting actors introduced by him. After working in a few Kannada films, Prakash Raj was relaunched as an actor in Tamil cinema through his debut Duet (1994) and had also performed in some of Balachander's soap opera productions in the 1990s. Through Manathil Uruthi Vendum (1987), Balachander launched Vivek as an actor, who initially worked with him as his assistant writer, and later went on to become a leading comedy actor. He also launched A. R. Rahman as a music director in his critically acclaimed and cult production, Roja (1992), now widely considered by many to be one of the greatest films ever made in Indian cinema.

Balachander was also a force to reckon with in Telugu cinema. Along with K. Vishwanath and Bapu, he was considered a trailblazer in the late 1970s to the late 1980s. Apart from remaking his own blockbusters in Telugu, he was also majorly known for his association with both Kamal Haasan and Chiranjeevi in Telugu. Maro Charitra (1980) and Rudraveena (1988) are considered by many to be two of the greatest Telugu films of all time. Equally, Chiranjeevi's performance in Rudraveena is considered to be one of the greatest of his career.

When the old era was dominated by commercial action films, Balachander directed socially themed films with women as protagonists usually centred on unusual or complicated interpersonal relationships and social themes. He portrayed women as headstrong, intelligent and independent people. Balachander revealed that many of his messages from his films, he has drawn inspiration from poet Subramaniya Bharathi whom he had admired since his childhood. Screenwriter Gopu (of Gopu-Babu) said that he used to begin his script from the ending and then construct the plot.

== Documentary ==
A documentary is getting ready about him. Ravisubramaniyan is selected by Kavithalaya for making documentary, to be released on 9 July 2020, the 90th birthday of the veteran Indian filmmaker. ^{[51]}

== Bibliography ==
- Ramachandran, Naman (2012). Rajnikanth: The Definitive Biography. Penguin Books Limited. ISBN 978-81-8475-796-5.
- Velayutham, Selvaraj (2008). Tamil Cinema: The Cultural Politics of India's other Film Industry. Taylor & Francis. ISBN 978-0-203-93037-3.
- Deep Focus: A Film Quarterly. Deep Focus. 1998.
