= List of Kannada films of 1993 =

== List ==
The following is a list of films produced in the Kannada film industry in India in 1993, presented in alphabetical order.

Title	Director	Cast	Music
Aaha Brahmachari	Guruprasad	Anil, Aarthi, Dwarakish, Ramesh Bhat	Raj–Koti
Aakasmika	T. S. Nagabharana	Rajkumar, Madhavi, Geetha, Vajramuni, Thoogudeepa Srinivas, Pandari Bai	Hamsalekha
Aathanka	Om Sai Prakash	Ananth Nag, Vinaya Prasad, Anjana	Hamsalekha
Abhijith	K. V. Raju	Devaraj, Khushbu, Avinash, Rockline Venkatesh	Sax Raja
Alimayya	Kishore Sarja	Arjun Sarja, Shruti, Silk Smitha, Lokesh, Doddanna	M. M. Keeravani
Amrutha Sindhu	S. R. Bhat	Shivaranjan, Shruti, Basavaraj Gudigeri, M. S. Umesh	V. Manohar
Ananda Jyothi	Chi. Dattaraj	Shivarajkumar, Sudharani, Chi Guru Dutt, Rockline Venkatesh, K. S. Ashwath	Vijay Anand
Angaiyalli Apsare	C. R. Simha	Kumar Bangarappa, Supriya, Srinath, Lokesh	S. P. Balasubrahmanyam
Annayya	Rajendra Singh Babu	V. Ravichandran, Madhoo, Aruna Irani, Srinath, Dheerendra Gopal	Hamsalekha
Anuragada Alegalu	S. Narayan	Raghavendra Rajkumar, Mamathashree, Balaraj, K. S. Ashwath	Hamsalekha
Apoorva Jodi	N. R. Nanjunde Gowda	Kumar Bangarappa, Heera Rajagopal, Thoogudeepa Srinivas, Loknath, Tara	Hamsalekha
Baa Nalle Madhuchandrake	Nagathihalli Chandrashekar	K. Shivram, Nandini Singh, Prakash Rai, Maanu, Tennis Krishna	Hamsalekha
Bahaddur Hennu	A. V. Sheshagiri Rao	Devaraj, Roopa Ganguly, Sridhar, Bank Janardhan	Rajan–Nagendra
Bevu Bella	S. Narayan	Jaggesh, Raagini, Lokesh	Hamsalekha
Bhagawan Sri Saibaba	Om Sai Prakash	Srinath, Tara, Jai Jagadish, Sudharani, Ramkumar, Ramesh Bhat, Shashikumar	Upendra Kumar; Hamsalekha
Bhavya Bharatha	Mohammed Ghouse	Tiger Prabhakar, Vinaya Prasad, Tara	V. Manohar
Bombat Huduga	K. V. Raju	Jaggesh, Priyanka, Bank Janardhan	V. Manohar
Captain	S. Narayan	Vinod Raj, Shilpa, Hemalatha, Chetan Raj	Vijay Anand
Chinna Nee Naguthiru	Chikkanna	Abhijeeth, Shamili, Geetha	Hamsalekha
Chinnari Mutha	T. S. Nagabharana	Vijay Raghavendra, Srinath, H. G. Dattatreya, Shanthamma, Sudharani	C. Ashwath
Chirabandhavya	M. S. Rajashekar	Shivarajkumar, Subhashri, Srikanya, K. S. Ashwath, Pandari Bai	Hamsalekha
Chukki Chandrama	N. R. Nanjunde Gowda	Suresh Heblikar, Nalina Murthy, Damarugendra, Srigowri	Upendra Kumar
Dakshayini	Rama Narayanan	Baby Shamili, Srinath, Sunil, Vinaya Prasad, Shruti	Shankar–Ganesh
Dharma Peeta	Om Sai Prakash	Shashikumar, Pooja, Srinath, Dheerendra Gopal	Hamsalekha
Gadibidi Ganda	V. S. Reddy	V. Ravichandran, Roja, Ramya Krishna, Jaggesh, Nagesh	Hamsalekha
Gejje Naada	Vijay - Nanjundappa	Ramkumar, Shwetha, K. S. Ashwath, Balakrishna, Pandari Bai	V. Manohar
Golibar	Ramu	Devaraj, Suresh Heblikar, Arundhati Nag	Hamsalekha
Gundana Maduve	G. K. Mudduraj	Jaggesh, Raagini, Vinaya Prasad, Lokesh, Bank Janardhan	V. Manohar
Hendthi Helidare Kelabeku	Relangi Narasimha Rao	Harish Kumar, Malashri, Dwarakish, Umashree, Srikanth	Chakravarthy
Hoovondu Beku Ballige	Phani Ramachandra	Anand Krishna, Vatsala Mohan, Vaishali Kasaravalli	Rajan–Nagendra
Hoovu Hannu	Rajendra Singh Babu	Lakshmi, Baby Shamili, Ajay Gundu Rao, Vaijayanthi, Jai Jagadish	Hamsalekha
Hosa Love Story	Raj Kishore	Veeresh, Saikumar, Megha, Yogish	Vijay Anand
Hrudaya Bandhana	B. Ramamurthy	Ambareesh, Sudharani, Vajramuni, Jai Jagadish	Hamsalekha
Jaga Mechida Huduga	H. R. Bhargava	Shivarajkumar, Raagini, Srinath, Tiger Prabhakar, Lakshmi	Rajan–Nagendra
Jailor Jagannath	A. T. Raghu	Devaraj, Tiger Prabhakar, Manjula Sharma, Vajramuni	Hamsalekha
Jamboo Savari	Lalitha Ravee	Master Jayanth, Kala, Bhargavi Narayan	Vijaya Bhaskar
Jana Mechhida Maga	B. D. Sheshu	Sridhar, Chandrika, Anjali Sudhakar, Jayanthi, Vajramuni	Manoranjan Prabhakar
Kadambari	Kodlu Ramakrishna	Naveen Chander, Shruti, Ananth Nag	Hamsalekha
Kalyana Rekhe	M. S. Rajashekar	Shashikumar, Malashri, K. S. Ashwath, Doddanna	Hamsalekha
Karimaleya Kaggathalu	E. Chennagangappa	Tara, Krishne Gowda, Vinod Prabhakar	R. Damodar
Kempaiah IPS	V. Somashekar	Shashikumar, Tiger Prabhakar, Rambha, Srishanthi	Hamsalekha
Kollura Sri Mookambika	Renuka Sharma	Sridhar, Bhavya, Vajramuni, Doddanna, Vijay Raghavendra	Pugalendi Mahadevan
Kumkuma Bhagya	B. Subba Rao	Srinath, Lakshmi, Sai Kumar, Sudharani, Balaraj, Abhinaya	Hamsalekha
Love Training	B. Ramamurthy	Kashinath, Ramesh Bhat, Tara, Manasa, Anjali Sudhakar, Abhinaya, Tennis Krishna	V. Manohar
Lovers	T. Janardhan	Vishwanath, Vijayashree, Niveditha, Madan Mallu	Madan Mallu
Mahendra Varma	Tiger Prabhakar	Tiger Prabhakar, Srishanthi, Tara, Vajramuni	Manoranjan Prabhakar
Mane Devru	V. Ravichandran	V. Ravichandran, Sudharani, K. S. Ashwath, Tennis Krishna	Hamsalekha
Mangalya Bandhana	S. K. Bhagavan	Ananth Nag, Malashri, Moon Moon Sen, K. S. Ashwath, Mynavathi	Hamsalekha
Manikantana Mahime	K. Shankar	Vishnuvardhan, Sharath Babu, Jayapradha, Tara, M. N. Nambiar	M. S. Viswanathan
Mechhida Madumaga	C. Paulraj	Sunil, Shruti, Ramesh Bhat, Sujatha	Manoranjan Prabhakar
Midida Hrudayagalu	A. T. Raghu	Ambareesh, Nirosha, Shruti, Doddanna, Ramesh Bhat, Girija Lokesh	Hamsalekha
Military Maava	N. T. Jayarama	Jaggesh, Komal Kumar, Raagini, Bank Janardhan	V. Manohar
Mojina Maduve	V. Narayan Swamy	Devaraj, Tara, Anjana, Disco Shanti, Mukhyamantri Chandru	Hamsalekha
Mouna Sangrama	Mohan Mallapalli	Abhijeeth, Shruthi, Raghuveer, Balaraj, Jayanthi	Hamsalekha
Muddina Maava	Om Sai Prakash	Shashikumar, Tara, Shruti, S. P. Balasubrahmanyam, Abhijeeth, Doddanna, Dwarakish	S. P. Balasubrahmanyam
Munjaneya Manju	P. H. Vishwanath	Ambareesh, Sudharani, Tara, Ramesh Bhat, K. S. Ashwath	Hamsalekha
Navibbaru Namagibbaru	M. S. Rajashekar	Raghavendra Rajkumar, Malashri, Subhashri, K. S. Ashwath, Jayanthi	Upendra Kumar
Nanendu Nimmavane	Phani Ramachandra	Vishnuvardhan, Srishanthi, Vinaya Prasad, Ramesh Bhat	Rajan–Nagendra
Nishkarsha	Sunil Kumar Desai	Vishnuvardhan, Ananth Nag, B. C. Patil, Suman Nagarkar, Anjana, Ramesh Bhat	Guna Singh
Prana Snehitha	H. R. Bhargava	Shankar Nag, Ramakrishna, Bhavya, Tara, Ramesh Bhat, Mukhyamantri Chandru	M. Ranga Rao
Prathipala	Dhananjay	Srinath, Sudharshan, Vijayaranjini, Anuradha, Pramila Joshai	Satyam
Premada Karanji	V. Shashi	Dileep, Priya, Asha, Gajendra Chauhan	Raveendran
Rayaru Bandaru Mavana Manege	Dwarakish	Vishnuvardhan, Dwarakish, Bindiya, Dolly, Vajramuni	Raj–Koti
Rajakeeya	Shivamani	Devaraj, Ananth Nag, Vishaka, Geetha, Abhijeeth	Hamsalekha
Ranjitha	K. V. Jayaram	Abhijeeth, Shruti, Ramanand	Aghasthya
Rupaayi Raja	B. Mallesh	Jaggesh, Shruti, Abhijeeth	Hamsalekha
Sangharsha	Sunil Kumar Desai	Vishnuvardhan, Thiagarajan, Geetha, Shivaranjani	Guna Singh
Server Somanna	K. Vasu	Jaggesh, Abhijeeth, Rambha, Pandari Bai	Raj–Koti
Shhh!	Upendra	Kumar Govind, Kashinath, Megha, Upendra, Suresh Heblikar	Sadhu Kokila
Shivanna	G. K. Mudduraj	Jaggesh, Vani, Komal Kumar, Bank Janardhan	V. Manohar
Shrungara Kavya	S. Mahendar	Raghuveer, Sindhu, Mukhyamantri Chandru, Tennis Krishna	Hamsalekha
Shri Durga Pooje	Om Sakthi	Vinaya Prasad, Srinivasa Murthy, Shruti, Raghuveer, Lakshmi	Kunnakudi Vaidyanathan
Suryodaya	A. T. Raghu	Ambareesh, Vinaya Prasad, Apsara, Srinath, Sridhar	Rajan–Nagendra
Urvashi Kalyana	Phani Ramachandra	Jaggesh, Priyanka, K. S. Ashwath	Rajan–Nagendra
Vaishakada Dinagalu	Katte Ramachandra	Vishnuvardhan, Moon Moon Sen, Harshavardhan, Vanitha Vasu	Indu Vishwanath
Vasantha Poornima	H. R. Bhargava	Ambareesh, Priyanka, Balaraj, K. S. Ashwath	Shankar–Ganesh
Vijaya Kranthi	Rajendra Kumar Arya	Shashikumar, Soundarya, Devaraj, Pallavi	Shankar–Ganesh
Vikram	Srikanth R. Kulkarni	Tiger Prabhakar, Chandrika	Shankar–Ganesh
Vishnu Vijaya	Keshu Ramsay	Vishnuvardhan, Akshay Kumar, Ashwini Bhave, Mamta Kulkarni, Puneet Issar	Jatin–Lalit
Wanted	Joe Simon	Shashikumar, Chandrika, Rajesh, Mukhyamantri Chandru	Hamsalekha

== See also ==
- Kannada films of 1992
- Kannada films of 1994
