= Sadaa Suhagan =

- Theatrical release poster
- Directed by: T. Rama Rao
- Written by: Dr. Achla Nagar (dialogues)
- Screenplay by: T. Rama Rao
- Story by: G. Balasubramaniam
- Based on: Dheerga Sumangali (1974) by A. C. Tirulokchandar
- Produced by: Vijay Soorma, Rajeev Kumar
- Starring: Jeetendra; Rekha
- Cinematography: V.Durgaprasad
- Edited by: Swamy; Balu
- Music by: Laxmikant-Pyarelal
- Production company: Vidya Shree Films
- Release date: 15 August 1986
- Running time: 150 minutes
- Country: India
- Language: Hindi
- Budget: est. ₹13.5 million
- Box office: ₹71 million

Sadaa Suhagan (transl. Perennially Married Woman) is a 1986 Hindi-language drama film, produced by Vijay Soorma, Rajeev Kumar for Vidya Shree Films and directed by T. Rama Rao. It stars Jeetendra and Rekha. The music was composed by Laxmikant-Pyarelal. It is remake of the Tamil movie Dheerga Sumangali (1974) which was remade in Telugu with the same name (1974), in Kannada as Bhagyavantharu (1974) and in Malayalam as Aayiram Janmangal (1976). It was a hit at the box office.

== Plot ==
Laxmi is a caring and virtuous wife. Raj Shekhar is an equally loving and faithful husband. He is an excellent provider and she plays the nurturer's role to perfection. They have two sons and a daughter. Rajshekhar was an orphan. He remained deprived of love until he married Laxmi. She came from a disturbed home with an alcoholic father and a scheming stepmother. Rajshekhar and Laxmi created a stable, happy family.

All is well until the children grow up. The eldest son, Ravi (Govinda), becomes involved with Madhu (Anuradha Patel), the daughter of a woman of ill-repute. Rajshekhar objects to this and Ravi leaves home. The second son, Shashi (Alankar Joshi), is caught red-handed after stealing money from his father and letting the domestic help (Mohan Choti) take the blame. Shashi is also turned out of the house. Rajshekhar and Laxmi discuss the marriage of their daughter, Babli (Sheela David), with the son of their friends. However, Babli refuses, saying that her mother wasted her life as a homemaker and she would not like to do the same.

The once-happy home is in a mess. Rajshekhar develops a heart problem and Laxmi takes him to the family doctor. While the doctor is checking Rajshekhar, Laxmi becomes unconscious for a short time. She is examined and the result is shocking: she has an advanced case of cancer, with only a few days remaining of her life. Rajshekhar requests the doctor not to inform her about this. He decides that his wife's last days should be as happy as possible. He finds Ravi, working as a petrol pump attendant and married to Madhu. Rajshekhar tells them about Laxmi's illness and begs them to return home for her sake. They obey. Then he traces Shashi and brings him back. Babli changes her mind on her own and decides to marry the son of her parents' friends. Madhu takes over the running of the household. She and Ravi are expecting a child. Laxmi is satisfied that unity and harmony are prevailing in her family. Everyone celebrates the twenty-fifth wedding anniversary of Laxmi and Rajshekhar. Back in their room, Laxmi collapses in her husband's arms; at the same moment, he has a heart attack. When the family members enter the room, they find Laxmi and Rajshekhar's bodies, joined in death as in life.

== Cast ==
- Jeetendra as Raj Shekhar Malhotra
- Rekha as Laxmi Malhotra
- Govinda as Ravi Malhotra
- Utpal Dutt as Pratap Singh
- Shafi Inamdar as Vinod
- Aruna Irani as Sujata
- Shubha Khote as Sheela, Laxmi's stepmother
- Anuradha Patel as Madhu, Ravi's Wife
- Purnima as Dai Maa Nirmala
- Alankar Joshi as Shashi Malhotra
- Sheela Sharma as Babli
- Mohan Choti as Keshav Servant
- Mehmood Jr. as Chotu, Laxmi's Mentally step brother
- Vikas Anand as Doctor Mohan Das

== Box office ==
The movie was very successful at the Box Office India website and well-appreciated by the audience. Made on a budget of ₹13.5m, the movie earned ₹71m worldwide and was declared a hit.

== Soundtrack ==
Lyrics: Anand Bakshi

Song	Singer
"Yeh Gussa Kaise Utrega, Main Kaise Tumhe Manaun"	Asha Bhosle, Mohammed Aziz
"Kehta Hai Sindoor Tera"	Kavita Krishnamurthy
"Hum Hain Naujawan"	Vijay Benedict, Kavita Krishnamurthy
"Kehta Hai Sindoor Tera (Sad)"	Kavita Krishnamurthy
"Billi Boli Meon"	Shabbir Kumar, Anuradha Paudwal
"Kabhie Kabhie Main Sochoon"	Kavita Krishnamurthy
"Kabhie Kabhie Main Sochoon (Sad)"	Kavita Krishnamurthy
