= Mastana (1970 film) =

- Poster
- Directed by: Adurthi Subba Rao
- Written by: O. P. Dutta; S. Ali Raza
- Story by: K. Balachander
- Produced by: Premji
- Starring: Mehmood; Padmini; Vinod Khanna; Bharathi
- Edited by: T.Krishna
- Music by: Laxmikant-Pyarelal
- Distributed by: Suchitra International
- Release date: 16 October 1970
- Country: India
- Language: Hindi

Mastana is a 1970 Bollywood comedy film directed by Adurthi Subba Rao. The film stars Mehmood and Vinod Khanna. The film is remake of the Telugu film Sattekalapu Satteya (1969), directed by K. Balachander, starring Chalam and which was remade in Tamil in 1970 as Patham Pasali starring Nagesh and in Kannada in 1980 as Manku Thimma by Dwarakish.

== Cast ==
- Mehmood as Satya / Mastana
- Padmini as Gauri
- Vinod Khanna as Inspector Prasad
- Bharathi as Sharda
- Rehman as Dhanraj
- Shyama as Mrs. Dhanraj
- Bobby as Naintara
- Mukri as Dhanraj's Chauffeur
- Leela Mishra as Nani
- Manorama as Mrs. Rosa Daniels
- Ramesh Deo as Jaggu
- Kamal Kapoor as Jaggu's Boss
- Hema Malini in a Guest appearance

== Soundtrack ==
Song	Singer
"Soyi Ja Tara"	Kishore Kumar
"Jagi Ja Tara"	Kishore Kumar
"Jab Jab Hum Tumka Dekhe Hai Re Chhaila, Man Mor Machave Shor"	Lata Mangeshkar, Kishore Kumar
"Maine Maa Ko Dekha Hai"	Lata Mangeshkar
"Pee Le Pee Le Pee Le"	Lata Mangeshkar
"Chhed Mere Hamrahi Geet Koi Aisa"	Lata Mangeshkar, Mohammed Rafi
"Nandlala Holi Khele Biraj Mein Dhoom Machi Hai"	Asha Bhosle, Mohammed Rafi, Mukesh
