= Karnataka State Film Award for Best Child Actor (Female) =

Indian film award

Karnataka State Film Award for Best Child Actress
- State award for contributions to Kannada cinema
- Awarded for: Best Performance by a Child Actress
- Sponsored by: Government of Karnataka
- Rewards: Silver Medal; ₹ 20,000
- First award: 1972-73
- Final award: 2021
- Most recent winner: Baby Bhairavi

Highlights
- Total awarded: 24
- First winner: Brunda

Karnataka State Film Award for Best Child Actor (Female) is a film award of the Indian state of Karnataka, given during the annual Karnataka State Film Awards. The award honours Kannada language films.

== Award winners ==
The following is a partial list of the award winners and the films they received it for.

Year	Winner	Role	Film
2021	Bhairavi		Bhairavi
2020	Hitaishi Poojar		Paaru
2019	Vaishnavi Adiga		Sugandhi
2018	Baby Sinchana		Andavada
2017	Shlagha Saligrama		Kataka
2016	Revathi; Siri Vanalli		Beti; Jeerjimbe
2015	Mevisha		Savi Nilaya
2014	Lahari		Aata Paata
2013	Shreya		Athi Aparoopa
2012	Lepana		Sheshu
2011	Suhasini		Bannada Kode
2010-11	Prakruthi	Chaitra	Hejjegalu
2009-10	Madhushree		Kinnara Baale
2008-09	Sanya Iyer	Rachana	Vimukthi
2007-08	Prakruthi		Gubbachchigalu
2006-07	No Award		
2005-06	No Award		
2004-05	Bodhini Bhargavi	Munni	Haseena
2003-04	No Award		
2002-03	Raksha		Bimba
2001-02	Deepa	Putti	Putti
2000-01	No Award		
1999-2000	No Award		
1997-98	Niveditha Shivarajkumar	Chummy	Andaman
1995-96	Sindhu	Meera	Mouna Raaga
1990-91	Shamili	Pallavi	Mathe Haditu Kogile
1989-90	Jahnavi		Belli Belaku
1985-86	Rekha	Thulasi	Thulasidala
1981-82	Rekha	Nancy	Simhada Mari Sainya
1976-77	Indira		Nagarahole
1975-76	Poornima Rajkumar	Shobha	Premada Kanike
1972-73	Brunda		Sankalpa

== See also ==
- Cinema of Karnataka
- List of Kannada-language films
