= H. R. Bhargava =

Indian film director

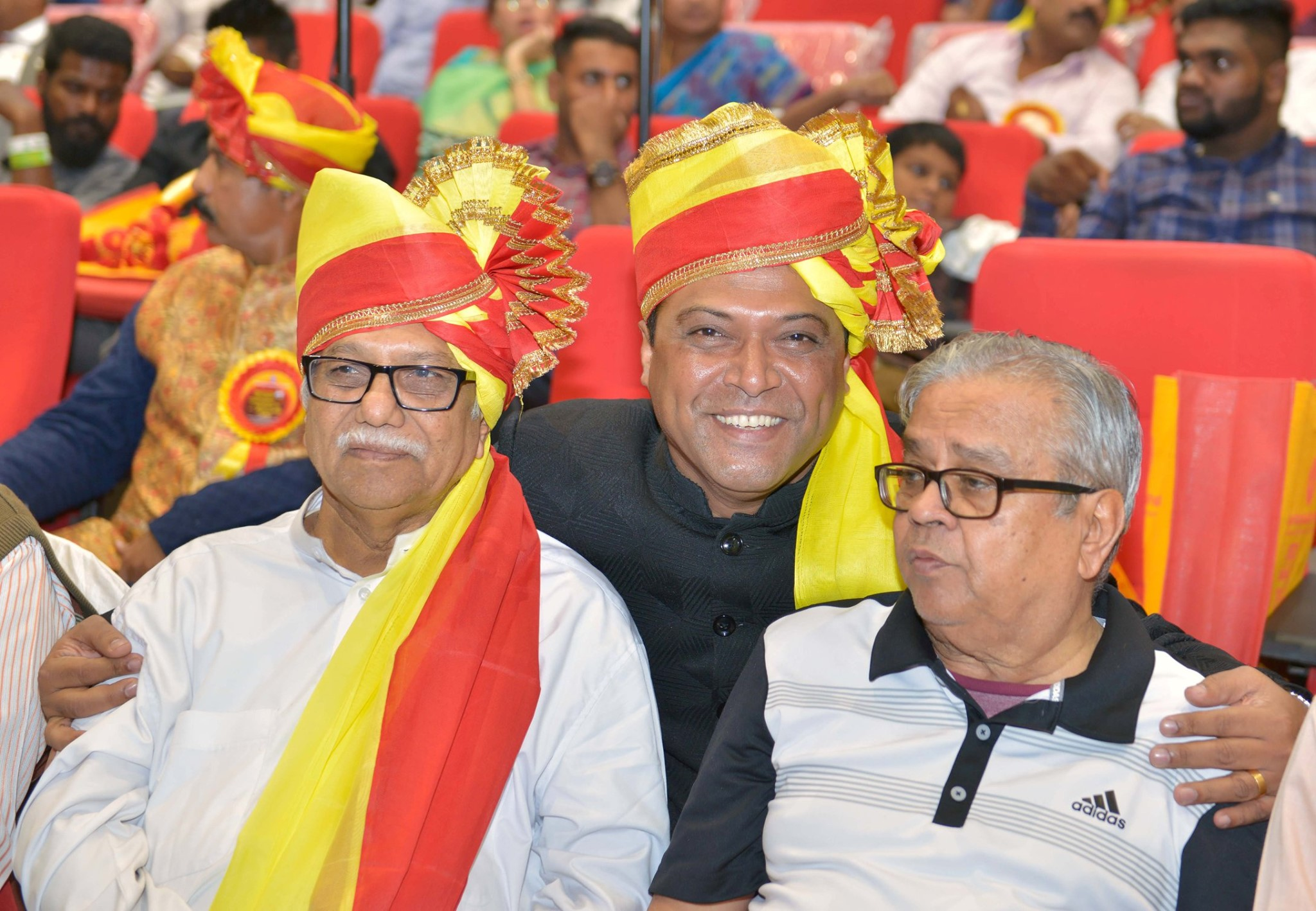
- Doddarangegowda, Syed Sallauddin Pasha, H. R. Bhargava (Left to right in front) in 2019
- Born: Hunsur Ramachandra Bhargyachandra; Hunsur, Mysore State (now Karnataka), India
- Occupations: Film director, producer
- Relatives: Hunsur Krishnamurthy (uncle) Dwarakish (cousin)

Hunsur Ramachandra Bhagyachandra (Kannada: ಹು. ರಾ. ಭಾರ್ಗವ), known mononymously as Bhargava, is an Indian film director who worked primarily in Kannada cinema. Originally a producer, he came to be considered one of the best directors in Kannada cinema, and he was awarded the Puttanna Kanagal Award, the highest award in Kannada cinema, in 2012. He has directed 50 films.

== Early life ==
Bhargava was born in Brahmin family, Hunsur taluk in the Mysore State (now Karnataka). Before becoming an independent director, he worked as an associate/assistant director with stalwarts of the time like Hunsur Krishnamurthy, S. Siddalingaiah, Vijay, Geethapriya and K. S. R. Das in many successful movies like Bangaarada Manushya, Bhakta Kumbara, Babruvahana, Naa Ninna Mareyalare, Mayor Muthanna, etc. This gave him a rich experience and moulded his career to become a famous director. He has many disciples who have become successful directors like S. Narayan, Phani Ramachandra, Chandrashekar Sharma. In many of his interviews he has expressed gratitude to director Hunsur Krishnamurthy and famous comedian Dwarakeesh.

== Career ==
Bhargava began his career in films as a film producer. Having produced eight films, he turned to direction. He made his debut as a director in 1977 with Bhagyavantharu with Rajkumar and B. Saroja Devi playing the lead roles. His next film Olavu Geluvu (1977) had Rajkumar and Lakshmi in lead roles. His next film Asadhya Aliya was with Vishnuvardhan and proved successful. He has directed 23 films for Dr. Vishnuvardhan with a high success rate for the combination like Jeevana Chakra, Karunamayi, Jana Nayaka, Hrudaya Geethe, Karna, Mathe Haaditu Kogile, Onde Guri, Krishna Nee Begane Baaro and many more. He has directed seven films for Ambareesh, four films for Anant Nag, two films for Shankar Nag, two films for Shiva Rajkumar and many other actors. He has three decades of film-making to his credit and also produced seven successful films. He is the only film director to have two silver Jubilee functions at the same place and same time. The mighty and historical Gandugali Kumara Rama was his 50th film. Music Directors Rajan-Nagendra have worked with him in more than 20 films. He has also worked with nationally noted music directors such as Laxmikant-Pyarelal, Bappi Lahiri, Satyam and Gurukiran.

== Filmography ==
Year	Film	Credited as		Language	Notes
Year	Film	Director	Screenwriter	Language	Notes
1977	Bhagyavantharu	✓	✓	Kannada	Directorial debut. Remake of Tamil film Dheerga Sumangali
1977	Olavu Geluvu	✓	✗	Kannada	
1979	Asadhya Aliya	✓	✗	Kannada	
1980	Manku Thimma	✓	✓	Kannada	Remake of Telugu film Sattekalapu Satteya
1980	Kulla Kulli	✓	✗	Kannada	
1981	Guru Shishyaru	✓	✗	Kannada	Remake of Telugu film Paramanandayya Sishyula Katha
1981	Avala Hejje	✓	✗	Kannada	Remake of Tamil film Thoondil Meen
1982	Bandhalu Anubandhalu	✓	✗	Telugu	Remake of Tamil film Thoondil Meen
1982	Pedda Gedda	✓	✗	Kannada	
1982	Tony	✓	✓	Kannada	
1983	Samarpane	✓	✓	Kannada	Based on novel by Usha Navratnaram
1983	Onde Guri	✓	✓	Kannada	Inspired by Mad Max
1983	Gandugali Rama	✓	✗	Kannada	
1984	Mooru Janma	✓	✓	Kannada	Based on a novel of same name by T. K. Rama Rao
1984	Bedaru Bombe	✓	✗	Kannada	
1984	Preethi Vathsalya	✓	✗	Kannada	First production venture
1985	Jeevana Chakra	✓	✓	Kannada	Remake of Telugu film Dharmaatmudu
1985	Vajra Mushti	✓	✗	Kannada	
1986	Karna	✓	✓	Kannada	Remake of Hindi film Saaheb
1986	Krishna Nee Begane Baro	✓	✓	Kannada	Remake of Hindi film Souten
1986	Maneye Manthralaya	✓	✓	Kannada	Remake of Hindi film Ghar Dwaar
1987	Karunamayi	✓	✗	Kannada	Based on novel by K. Saroja Rao; Remade in Tamil as Ponmana Selvan
1987	Shanthi Nivasa	✓	✗	Kannada	Remake Tamil film Vietnam Veedu
1987	Kurukshetra	✓	✓	Kannada	Remake of Malayalam film Vartha
1987	Sowbhagya Lakshmi	✓	✓	Kannada	Remake of Telugu film Karthika Deepam
1987	Shubha Milana	✓	✓	Kannada	Remake of Telugu film Aalu Magalu
1988	Krishna Rukmini	✓	✗	Kannada	
1988	Jana Nayaka	✓	✓	Kannada	
1988	Nammoora Raja	✓	✓	Kannada	Remade in Tamil as Vaathiyaar Veettu Pillai
1989	Hrudaya Geethe	✓	✓	Kannada	Based on Hindi film Pagla Kahin Ka
1990	Hosa Jeevana	✓	✓	Kannada	Remake of Tamil film Pudhea Paadhai
1990	Shivashankar	✓	✓	Kannada	
1990	Mathe Haditu Kogile	✓	✓	Kannada	
1990	Chapala Chennigaraya	✓	✓	Kannada	Remake of Tamil film Chinna Veedu
1991	Aranyadalli Abhimanyu	✓	✓	Kannada	
1991	Nagunagutha Nali	✓	✗	Kannada	
1991	Gandanige Takka Hendathi	✓	✗	Kannada	
1991	Jagadeka Veera	✓	✓	Kannada	
1992	Rajadhi Raja	✓	✓	Kannada	
1992	Prema Sangama	✓	✓	Kannada	
1992	Sapthapadi	✓	✗	Kannada	Based on a novel by Saisuthe
1993	Prana Snehitha	✓	✓	Kannada	
1993	Vasantha Poornima	✓	✗	Kannada	
1993	Jaga Mechida Huduga	✓	✗	Kannada	Based on novel Nishaanth by Saisuthe
1994	Sammilana	✓	✓	Kannada	Based on a novel by Saisuthe
1995	Bangarada Kalasha	✓	✓	Kannada	
1996	Bangarada Mane	✓	✓	Kannada	
1997	Janani Janmabhoomi	✓	✓	Kannada	
1998	High Command	✓	✗	Kannada	
2006	Gandugali Kumara Rama	✓	✓	Kannada	Based on a novel by Su. Rudramurthy Shastry
