= Manku Thimma =

1980 film by H. R. Bhargava

- VCD cover
- Directed by: H. R. Bhargava
- Written by: Chi. Udaya Shankar
- Screenplay by: H. R. Bhargava
- Produced by: Dwarakish
- Starring: Dwarakish; Manjula; Srinath; Padmapriya
- Cinematography: D. V. Rajaram; N. K. Sathish
- Edited by: Yadav Victor
- Music by: Rajan–Nagendra
- Production company: Dwarakish Chithra
- Distributed by: Dwarakish Chithra
- Release date: 5 September 1980
- Running time: 139 minutes
- Country: India
- Language: Kannada

Manku Thimma is a 1980 Indian Kannada-language film, directed by H. R. Bhargava and produced by Dwarakish. The film stars Dwarakish, Manjula, Srinath, Padmapriya and Hema Chowdhary. The film has musical score by Rajan–Nagendra. It is a remake of the 1969 Telugu film Sattekalapu Satteya which was also remade in Hindi in 1970 as Mastana starring Mehmood and in Tamil in 1970 as Patham Pasali starring Nagesh.

== Cast ==
- Dwarakish as Thimma
- Manjula as Gowri
- Srinath as Inspector Prasad
- Padmapriya as Padma
- Maanu as Kumar
- Hema Choudhary as Roopadevi
- Baby Lakshmi as Thara
- Thoogudeepa Srinivas
- Sudheer as Jaggu
- Uma Shivakumar as Miss Daniel
- B. Jayashree as Prasad's mother
- Arikesari
- Chethan Ramarao
- Shani Mahadevappa, Secretary of Kumar
- Sharapanjara Iyengar
- Papamma as mother of Kumar
- Srigowri
- Kokila
- Prabhakar Reddy
- Chanda
- Giri Dwarakish (uncredited)

== Soundtrack ==
The music was composed by Rajan–Nagendra.

No.	Song	Singers	Lyrics	Length (m:ss)
1	"Ninna Nodidaaga"	S. Janaki, S. P. Balasubrahmanyam	Chi. Udaya Shankar	04:30
2	"Nodu Nannomme Nodu"	S. P. Balasubrahmanyam, S. Janaki	Chi. Udaya Shankar	04:33
3	"Nanna Muddu Thaare"	S. P. Balasubrahmanyam	Chi. Udaya Shankar	04:17
4	"Ide Ba Illide Ba"	S. Janaki	Chi. Udaya Shankar	04:15
5	"Nanna Muddu Thaare" (Sad)	S. P. Balasubrahmanyam, S. Janaki	Chi. Udaya Shankar	04:20
