= Rukmini (film) =

- Theatrical release poster
- Directed by: Ravi Raja Pinisetty
- Produced by: Jonnada Ramana Murthy
- Starring: Vineeth; Rukmini
- Cinematography: Ram Pinisetty
- Music by: Vidyasagar
- Release date: 18 September 1997
- Country: India
- Language: Telugu

Rukmini is a 1997 Indian Telugu-language romantic drama film directed by Ravi Raja Pinisetty and starring Vineeth and Preetha Vijayakumar (credited as Rukmini). The film is a remake of the Kannada film Panchama Veda (1990), by P. H. Vishwanath.

== Cast ==
- Vineeth as Ravi
- Rukmini as Rukmini
- Vijayakumar as Dorababu
- Nagendra Babu as Bandababu
- Sridevi Vijayakumar as Sita, Rukmini's younger sister
- Sai Krishna as Kiran
- Vankayala Satyanarayana as Govinda Rao
- M. S. Narayana
- Venu Madhav
- Raksha as Nurse
- Dasari Narayana Rao (special appearance)

== Production ==
Preetha Vijayakumar was offered the lead role in the film after being spotted when accompanying her mother, Manjula Vijayakumar, to a film shoot in Hyderabad during her school holidays.

== Reception ==
Giddaluru Gopala Rao from Zamin Ryot wrote that "the whole film was done with aplomb". A critic from Andhra Today wrote that "Pinisetty's direction, as expected, is good. But his good work alone may not be sufficient to make up for the lack of variety and entertainment glaringly evident in the film".

The film became a profitable venture, with the success leading to the sale of Rukmini-branded clothes.
