= Avala Hejje =

- Directed by: H. R. Bhargava
- Written by: Chi. Udaya Shankar (dialogues)
- Screenplay by: M. D. Sundar
- Story by: J. Seetharam
- Produced by: V. C. Ganesh
- Starring: Dr. Vishnuvardhan; Lakshmi; Dr. Ambarish; Dwarakish
- Cinematography: D. V. Rajaram, N. K. Sathish
- Edited by: M. Umanath
- Music by: Rajan–Nagendra; Lyrics: Chi. Udaya Shankar
- Distributed by: Varalakshmi
- Release date: 24 February 1981
- Running time: 120 minutes
- Country: India
- Language: Kannada

Avala Hejje ( transl. Her footsteps) is a 1981 Indian Kannada-language film, directed by H. R. Bhargava, starring Dr. Vishnuvardhan, Lakshmi, Dr. Ambrish and Dwarakish. The film is a remake of 1977 Tamil film Thoondil Meen. In 1982, this film was remade in Telugu as Bandhalu Anubandhalu by the same director. Lakshmi herself was the producer of the Telugu version. She was also the heroine in all three versions.

== Plot ==
The film begins with a stranger chasing Seetha (Lakshmi) trying to molest her. A flashback shows that Lakshmi was Ambareesh's love interest before her marriage to Vishnuvardhan. Lakshmi is now happily married to Vishnuvardhan, who is a neurosurgeon. In the absence of Vishnuvardhan, Ambareesh visits Lakshmi to threaten her. One day Lakshmi unintentionally fires a bullet from her husband's revolver to Ambareesh's forehead and he becomes unconscious. With the help of Dwarakish, Vishnuvardhan's assistant in the hospital, Lakshmi takes Ambareesh's body out of the city and drops it from a bridge, thinking he has died. Without knowing about all these incidents, Vishnuvardhan returns home and finds one of the bullets missing in his revolver, which is clarified by Lakshmi's arguments. Unknowingly, Ambareesh is admitted to Vishnu's hospital and he forgets all his past. Doctor Vishnu treats him and is determined to cure him. When Ambareesh recalls his past, he sees Vishnu, his brother, who he lost in his childhood and recalls everything. The rest of the story is about how Vishnu and Ambareesh confront each other and solve their problems.

This film is known for its songs and good acting by Lakshmi and the humorous role of Dwarakish. The movie had a successful run of 25 weeks in Bangalore, its total box office collection was 50 lakhs.

== Cast ==
- Vishnuvardhan
- Lakshmi as Seetha
- Ambareesh as Ranga
- Dwarakish
- Sundar Krishna Urs
- Seetharam

== Soundtrack ==
The music was composed by Rajan–Nagendra.

Avala Hejje

Soundtrack album by Rajan–Nagendra
- Released: 1981
- Genre: Feature film soundtrack
- Label: Sangeetha

No.	Song	Singers	Lyrics	Length (m:ss)
1	"Bandeya Baalina"	S. Janaki, S. P. Balasubrahmanyam	Chi. Udaya Shankar	04:14
2	"Aakasha Neeraagali"	S. Janaki, S. P. Balasubrahmanyam	Chi. Udaya Shankar	04:18
3	"Neralanu Kaanada"	S. P. Balasubrahmanyam	Chi. Udaya Shankar	04:02
4	"Devara Aata"	S. Janaki	Chi. Udaya Shankar	04:33
