= Balaraj =

Indian Kannada film actor

- Born: Karnataka, India
- Occupation: Film actor

Balaraj is an Indian actor in the Kannada film industry. He has appeared in Anand (1986), Ratha Sapthami (1986), Shiva Mecchida Kannappa (1988) and Samyuktha (1988).

== Television ==
- Mane Aliya
- Parvathi
- Preethi Madu Thamashe Nodu
- Durga
- Kanyadana
- Suryavamsha
- Silli Lalli
- Kalyani
- Gokula
- Kalyanirama
- Ramachaari (TV series)
- Shravani Subramanya

== Selected filmography ==
Balaraj has appeared in the following Kannada films.

1. Anand (1986)
2. Ratha Sapthami (1986)
3. Mana Mecchida Hudugi (1987)
4. Chiranjeevi Sudhakar (1988)
5. Samyuktha (1988)
6. Shiva Mecchida Kannappa (1988)
7. Sharavegada Saradara (1989)
8. Nanjundi Kalyana (1989)
9. Nambidre Nambi Bitre Bidi (1990)
10. Rudra Thandava (1990)
11. Neene Nanna Jeeva (1990)
12. Thavarumane Udugore (1991)
13. Police Matthu Dada (1991)
14. Hrudaya Haadithu (1991)
15. Bangaradantha Maga (1991)
16. Nagaradalli Nayakaru (1992)
17. Mavanige Thakka Aliya (1992)
18. Malashree Mamashree (1992)
19. Jeevana Chaitra (1992)
20. Sidukabeda Singari (1993)
21. Poorna Sangrama (1993)
22. Vasantha Poornima (1993)
23. Mouna Sangrama (1993)
24. Kumkuma Bhagya (1993)
25. Hendthi Helidare Kelabeku (1993)
26. Dharma Peeta (1993)
27. Anuragada Alegalu (1993)
28. Sammilana (1994)
29. Sagara Deepa (1994)
30. Mana Midiyithu (1995)
31. Sipayi (1996)
32. Mouna Raga (1996)
33. Ammavra Ganda (1997)
34. Chora Chittha Chora (1999)
35. Bannada Hejje (2000)
36. Yuvaraja (2001)
37. Aunty Preethse (2001)
38. Olu Saar Baree Olu (2002)
39. Kogile O Kogile (2002)
40. Kambalahalli (2002)
41. Sye (2005)
42. Rakshaka (2007)
43. Aliya Geleya (2009)
44. Panchavati (2011)
45. Krishnan Marriage Story (2011)
46. Katari Veera Surasundarangi (2012)

== See also ==
- List of people from Karnataka
- Cinema of Karnataka
- List of Indian film actors
- Cinema of India
