= Panchama Veda (film) =

- Directed by: P. H. Vishwanath
- Written by: P. H. Vishwanath, T. N. Seetharam (dialogues)
- Produced by: Rajkumar; P. R. Prabhakar; Sarojamma
- Starring: Ramesh Aravind; Sudharani; Ramakrishna; Geetha
- Cinematography: R. Manjunath
- Edited by: Suresh Urs
- Music by: Sangeetha Raja
- Production company: Sri Sathyasai Combines
- Release date: 1990
- Running time: 139 minutes
- Country: India
- Language: Kannada

Panchama Veda (transl. Fifth Veda) is a 1990 Indian Kannada-language romantic drama film directed by P. H. Vishwanath, in his first independent film as a director. Vishwanath also wrote the screenplay, while the dialogues were written by T. N. Seetharam. The film stars Ramesh Aravind, Sudharani and Ramakrishna. The film had musical score by Sangeetha Raja.

The film was critically acclaimed and won multiple awards at the Karnataka State Film Awards for the year 1989–90. The film was remade in Telugu in 1997 as Rukmini.

== Cast ==
- Ramesh Aravind as Anand
- Sudharani as Rukmini
- Ramakrishna as Ravi
- Sihi Kahi Geetha
- Kashi
- Krishne Gowda as Sharabhayya
- Nagendra Shah
- Sujatha
- Geethanjali
- Sundaramma

== Soundtrack ==
The soundtrack of the film was composed by Sangeetha Raja.

Track listing
No.	Title	Lyrics	Singer(s)	Length
1.	"Aase Holeye Ukki Haridaithe"	Doddarange Gowda	K. S. Chithra
2.	"Nee Thanda Preethi"	M. N. Vyasa Rao	S. P. Balasubrahmanyam & K. S. Chithra
3.	"Aase Holeye Batthi Hogaithe"	Doddarange Gowda	K. J. Yesudas

== Awards ==
- Karnataka State Film Awards 1989-90
1. Best Actress - Sudharani
2. Best Dialogue writer - T. N. Seetharam
3. Best Editing - Suresh Urs
