= Malootty =

1990 Indian film

- Poster
- Directed by: Bharathan
- Written by: John Paul
- Produced by: Ajitha Hari
- Starring: Shamili; Jayaram; Urvashi
- Cinematography: Venu
- Edited by: B. Lenin; V. T. Vijayan
- Music by: Johnson
- Release date: 2 February 1990
- Country: India
- Language: Malayalam

Malootty is a 1990 Indian Malayalam-language survival drama film directed by Bharathan, starring Shamili in the title role along with Jayaram and Urvashi. The story is set in the 1980s, in which a girl is trapped in a drilled bore-well and survives after many hours. The title drawings were done by Bharathan's son. Shamili won the Kerala State Film Award for Best Child Artist.

== Plot ==
Five-year-old Malootty is the only child of Raji and Unnikrishnan, who is on a vacation with them. Events take a tragic turn when she visits a vacation home, suddenly falls into a drill hole while playing ball with her dog, and becomes stuck inside. Unnikrishnan frantically struggles to rescue her.

== Cast ==
- Baby Shamili as Malootty
- Jayaram as Unnikrishnan
- Urvashi as Raji
- K.P.A.C. Lalitha as Saraswathi
- Nedumudi Venu as Raghavan
- Innocent as Sankaran
- Devan as Wilson Cherian
- Priya (voice over by Valsamma)
- Sreenath
- Prathapachandran
- Kunjandi
- K.P.A.C.Ramachandran Nair as Doctor (voice over by Hari)

== Soundtrack ==
All lyrics are written by Pazhavila Rameshan; all music is composed by Johnson. Sujatha Mohan received the Kerala Film Critics Association Award for Best Female Playback Singer for her renditions in this film.

No.	Title	Singer(s)	Length
1.	"Mounathin Idanaazhiyil"	Sujatha Mohan
2.	"Mounathin Idanaazhiyil"	K. J. Yesudas, Sujatha Mohan
3.	"Swargangal Swapnam Kaanum"	Sujatha Mohan, G. Venugopal
4.	"Mounathin Idanaazhiyil" (Male)	K. J. Yesudas
