= Prema Sangama =

- Directed by: Bhargava
- Written by: Karaikudi Narayanan
- Screenplay by: Bhargava
- Produced by: B. P. Somu; B. P. Thyagu; B. P. Maruthi
- Starring: Ambareesh; Malashri; Tara; Hema Choudhary
- Cinematography: R. Madhusudhan
- Edited by: S. Manohar
- Music by: Rajan–Nagendra
- Production company: Sri Pooja Combines
- Release date: 11 June 1992
- Running time: 129 minutes
- Country: India
- Language: Kannada

Prema Sangama is a 1992 Indian Kannada-language romance film directed by Bhargava and written by Karaikudi Narayanan. The film stars Ambareesh and Malashri. The film had cinematography by R. Madhusudhan and the dialogues and lyrics are written by Chi. Udaya Shankar.

The film's music was composed by Rajan–Nagendra and the audio was launched on the Lahari Music banner.

== Cast ==
- Ambareesh
- Malashri
- Tara
- Hema Choudhary
- Jai Jagadish
- Saikumar
- Shivaram
- Mynavathi
- Ramesh Bhat
- M. S. Umesh
- Honnavalli Krishna
- Kunigal Nagabhushan
- Sohini
- Anitharani

== Soundtrack ==
The music of the film was composed by Rajan–Nagendra with lyrics by Chi. Udaya Shankar, Su. Rudramurthy Shastry, Shyamsundar Kulkarni and Sri Ranga.

Track listing
No.	Title	Singer(s)	Length
1.	"Chanda O Chanda"	S. P. Balasubrahmanyam	4:36
2.	"Nanna Jodi Neenu"	S. P. Balasubrahmanyam, Manjula Gururaj	5:04
3.	"Muddada Mogadalli"	Manjula Gururaj	5:18
4.	"Honna Kogile"	S. P. Balasubrahmanyam, K. S. Chithra	4:23
5.	"Preethi I Love You"	S. P. Balasubrahmanyam, Manjula Gururaj	4:42
6.	"Jolly Day One Day"	S. P. Balasubrahmanyam, K. S. Chithra	5:06
Total length:			29:09
