= Andaman (1998 film) =

- Directed by: P. H. Vishwanath
- Written by: P. H. Vishwanath
- Produced by: Padmalatha
- Starring: Shiva Rajkumar; Soni; Vinaya Prasad
- Cinematography: P. Rajan
- Edited by: B. S. Kemparaj
- Music by: Hamsalekha
- Production company: Sri Jwalamalini Devi Productions
- Release date: 10 April 1998
- Running time: 138 min
- Country: India
- Language: Kannada

Andaman is a 1998 Indian Kannada-language drama film written and directed by P. H. Vishwanath. The film starred Shiva Rajkumar and Soni. Shiv Rajkumar's daughter Niveditha made her acting debut featuring in a prominent role and won the Karnataka State Film Award for her performance. The film had a musical score by Hamsalekha and was jointly produced by Padmalatha.

== Plot ==
Monisha and Anand are a happily married couple with a child, Chummi. But a small misunderstanding leads to their divorce leaving Anand pining for his daughter's affection. Though Chummy wants to stay with her father but Monisha wants none of it. It is revealed that Monisha's friend Aravind is responsible for creating misunderstanding between the couple for not being able to marry Monisha whom he is in love with since childhood. In the end, Aravind gets killed by falling off from elevator and the couple gets united.

== Cast ==
- Shiva Rajkumar as Anand
- Soni as Monisha
- Sumanth as Aravind
- Niveditha Shiva Rajkumar as Chummy
- Vinaya Prasad as Zubeidaa
- H. G. Dattatreya as Lieutenant Governor of Andaman and Nicobar Islands
- Ramesh Pandit as SI Khader

== Production ==
The director had revealed that he decided to pen a story about father - daughter relationship after watching the 1995 Russian movie American Daughter - a story about a man who kidnaps his daughter who was in possession of his ex-wife, goes hitchhiking with her throughout America and ends up in prison but refuses to abandon her in exchange of his release. The director decided to set his story in Bhutan and decided to cast Filipino actress Sharmaine Arnaiz after watching her performance in a movie he watched at an International Film Festival. Though initially she had agreed to be a part of the movie, she dropped out owing to scheduling conflicts and her commitment to Japanese film. After her exit, it was decided to set the movie in Andaman. Ramesh Aravind was the initial choice to play the anti-hero character Aravind but opted out in the end due to dates issue.

== Soundtrack ==
All the songs are composed and written by Hamsalekha.

Sl No	Song title	Singer(s)
1	"Naada Naada"	S. P. Balasubrahmanyam, K. S. Chithra
2	"Doora Doora"	S. P. Balasubrahmanyam
3	"O Magu Nee Nagu"	S. P. Balasubrahmanyam, K. S. Chithra
4	"Kaala Meeri Yeke"	S. P. Balasubrahmanyam, K. S. Chithra
5	"Nenapu Nenapu"	Rajesh Krishnan, K. S. Chithra
6	"Andaman Andaman"	Shiva Rajkumar, K. S. Chithra

== Awards ==
- Karnataka State Film Award for Best Child Actor (Female) - Baby Niveditha Shiva Rajkumar
