= Krishna Nee Begane Baro (film) =

- VCD cover
- Directed by: H. R. Bhargava
- Written by: Chi. Udaya Shankar
- Screenplay by: H. R. Bhargava
- Story by: Kamleshwar
- Produced by: Amrutha Singh; Anuradha Singh; Dushyanth Singh
- Starring: Vishnuvardhan; Bhavya; Kim; Mukhyamantri Chandru
- Cinematography: D. V. Rajaram
- Edited by: Gautham Raju
- Music by: Bappi Lahiri
- Production company: Rohini Pictures
- Distributed by: Rohini Pictures
- Release date: 10 September 1986
- Running time: 137 min
- Country: India
- Language: Kannada

Krishna Nee Begane Baro is a 1986 Indian Kannada-language film, directed by H. R. Bhargava and produced by Amrutha Singh, Anuradha Singh and Dushyanth Singh. The film stars Vishnuvardhan, Bhavya, Kim and Mukhyamantri Chandru. The film has musical score by Bappi Lahiri. The movie was a remake of the 1983 Hindi movie Souten whose Telugu remake Thene Manasulu was directed by the producer of this movie – Rajendra Singh Babu.

== Cast ==
- Vishnuvardhan as Krishna
- Bhavya as Radha
- Kim as Rukmini
- Mukhyamantri Chandru
- Vishwavijetha
- Rajanand
- Govinda Rao
- Arikesari
- Mysore Lokesh
- Sangram Singh
- Phani Ramachandra
- Thimmaiah
- Karanth
- Janardhan
- Bemel Somanna
- Dayanand
- Uma Shivakumar
- Prarthana
- Sarvamangala
- Sarojini Shetty
- Baby Sunitha

== Soundtrack ==
Soundtrack was composed by Bappi Lahiri.

- Aalare Aalare – S. Janaki
- Mummy Mummy – S. P. Balasubrahmanyam, S. Janaki
- Ee Baalali Shanti Ellide – S. P. Balasubrahmanyam, S. Janaki
- Mammayya Mammayya – S. Janaki
- Ee Radhege – S. Janaki
