= Valleem Thetti Pulleem Thetti =

2016 film by Rishi Sivakumar

- Theatrical release poster
- Directed by: Rishi Sivakumar
- Written by: Rishi S Jijo Seban
- Screenplay by: Jijo Seban
- Story by: Jijo Seban
- Produced by: Faizal Latheef; Sajeev Meera; Sahib Rawther
- Starring: Kunchacko Boban; Shamili; Renji Panicker; Manoj K.Jayan; Saiju Kurup; Sreejith Ravi
- Cinematography: Kunjunni S. Kumar
- Edited by: Baiju Kurup
- Music by: Sooraj S. Kurup
- Production company: Achappu Movie Magic
- Distributed by: Kalasangham Films; Popcorn Entertainments
- Release date: 12 May 2016
- Running time: 148 minutes
- Country: India
- Language: Malayalam

Valleem Thetti Pulleem Thetti is a 2016 Indian Malayalam-language romantic comedy film written and directed by Rishi Sivakumar (in his directorial debut). It stars Kunchacko Boban, Renji Panicker, Manoj K.Jayan, Saiju Kurup and Shamili (in her first and only Malayalam film as a leading actress). The film hinges on cinema culture and the presentation of 1990s film themes & styles. The film was released on 12 May 2016 but was panned and flopped at the box office.

== Plot ==
The story is set in the 1990s in a village and its about film culture. Vinayan is a young man, who works as a projector operator in Sreedevi Talkies, an old "C" class cinema theatre. The owner of the theatre is Madhavan Nair, who is like a godfather to Vinayan. Madhavan inherited it from his father who was a film nut. Madhavan finds it hard to run the business and loses his right to land to the village's wealthy businessman Menon due to debt and leaves the village. Vinayan is in love with Menon's daughter, Sreedevi. Neer is the town's infamous moonshiner who supports Vinayan's love and dies later in an accident resulting from intoxication. Vinayan and his friends often get in trouble with Biju and his friends over petty issues. During the village's annual temple festival Vinayan plans to run away with Sreedevi. Menon finds this out and attempts to kill Vinayan. A misfired firework during the festival lands on Menon and he dies off-screen. Everyone in the village is happy and they continue the talkies that were on the verge of shutdown.

== Cast ==
- Kunchacko Boban as Vinayan (Prem Nazir)
  - Aniroodh as Young Vinayan
- Renji Panicker as Madhavan
- Manoj K Jayan as Muneer (Neer Ashan)
- Saiju Kurup as Biju (Bhajrangan)
- Krishna Sankar as Gagan
- Shamili as Sreedevi
- Miya as Sreekala
- Muthumani as Vanaja
- Aneesh G Menon as Jose
- Seema G. Nair as Madhavi
- Bindhu as Sreeja Menon
- Suresh Krishna as Menon (Bhagavaan)
- Sudheer Karamana as Vedikettu Velayudhan
- Sreejith Ravi as Pothan
- Kalabhavan Haneef as Nair
- Revathy Sivakumar as Malootty
- Chembil Ashokan as Govachan
- Lukman Avaran as Filament Philip
