= Kempaiah IPS =

- Directed by: V. Somashekhar
- Written by: V. Somashekhar
- Screenplay by: V. Somashekhar
- Produced by: L Ravindra
- Starring: Shashikumar; Tiger Prabhakar; Rambha; Srishanthi
- Cinematography: H. G. Raju
- Edited by: Victor Yadav
- Music by: Hamsalekha
- Production company: Sharada Pictures
- Release date: 6 October 1993
- Country: India
- Language: Kannada

Kempaiah IPS is a 1993 Indian Kannada film, directed by V. Somashekhar and produced by L. Ravindra, about the Indian Police Service (IPS) officer Kempaiah. The film stars Shashikumar in the titual role, Tiger Prabhakar, Rambha and Srishanthi in the lead roles. The film was scored by Hamsalekha.
