= Jana Nayaka =

1988 film by H. R. Bhargava

- VCD cover
- Directed by: H. R. Bhargava
- Written by: B. L. Venu(dialogues)
- Screenplay by: Bhargava
- Story by: N. T. Jayarama Reddy
- Produced by: Rajaram; Bhargava
- Starring: Vishnuvardhan; Bhavya; Sudheer; Doddanna
- Cinematography: D. V. Rajaram
- Edited by: Victor
- Music by: Rajan–Nagendra
- Release date: 1988
- Running time: 142 minutes
- Country: India
- Language: Kannada

Jana Nayaka is a 1988 Indian Kannada-language political drama film directed by H. R. Bhargava, jointly produced by Bhargava and Rajaram, edited by Victor, starring Vishnuvardhan, Bhavya and Sudheer in the lead roles with Doddanna, Devaraj, Mukhyamantri Chandru, Ramesh Bhat, Sundar Krishna Urs, K. S. Ashwath, Rajanand and Umashree in the supporting roles. The Rajan–Nagendra duo composed and scored the film's soundtrack.

== Plot ==
Janardhan's father is murdered by a group of criminals while trying to expose them. Enraged, Janardhan sets out to avenge his father's death.

== Cast ==
- Vishnuvardhan as Janardhan
- Bhavya as Shanthi
- Sudheer as Veerabhadriah (Veerabhadru)
- Doddanna as Nugeerappa
- Devaraj as Narasimha
- Mukhyamantri Chandru as Pampayya (Pampu)
- Ramesh Bhat as Shivu
- Sundar Krishna Urs as Secretary Seenu
- K. S. Ashwath
- Rajanand
- Umashree as Paari
- Mysore Lokesh
- Bank Janardhan

== Soundtrack ==
The songs was composed by Rajan–Nagendra.

| Song | Playback | Duration |
|---|---|---|
| Jana Nayaka Namma Oorige | K. S. Chithra, S. P. Balasubrahmanyam | 5:02 |
| Doo Doo Basavanna | K. S. Chithra, S. P. Balasubrahmanyam | 4:43 |
| Sukumari Sundarangiye | K. S. Chithra, S. P. Balasubrahmanyam | 4:36 |
| Madhuchandra Bandha | K. S. Chithra, S. P. Balasubrahmanyam | 4:37 |
| Veeradhi Veera Kane | S. P. Balasubrahmanyam | 4:36 |
