= Lambu Nagesh =

Indian Kannada film actor

- Died: September 1, 2017
- Occupation: Actor
- Years active: 1992–2017

Lambu Nagesh (died September 1, 2017) was an Indian actor who appeared in many Kannada films, television shows, and plays.

== Career ==
Lambu Nagesh started his career in the arts as an actor in plays, working with B. Jayashree. After that, he started acting in television shows, which is when he started to gain popularity. Nagesh acted in his first film, Prithviraj, in 1992. From then to his death, he acted in 100 films and TV series, mostly playing supporting roles and villain characters.

== Partial filmography ==
- Belli Kalungura (1992)
- Pruthviraj (1992)
- Abhijith (1993)
- Bhuvaneshwari (1994)
- Adhipathi (1994)
- Huliya (1996)
- Jagadeeshwari (1998)
- Police Dog (2002)
- Devara Makkalu (2003)
- Body Guard (2003)
- Joke Falls (2004)
- Olave (2005)
- Mahanagara (2006)
- Naga (2006)
- Neelkanta (2006)
- Policy Story 2 (2007)
- Gaja (2008)
- Iniya (2009)
- Boss (2011)

Production manager

- Kiragoorina Gayyaligalu (2016)

== Death ==
In late October 2017, Nagesh developed a liver disorder, and was taken to the MS Ramaiah Hospital for treatment. Five days later, on September 1, he died. Nagesh's family allowed his fans to pay tribute to him after his death.
