= Lalanam =

- Directed by: Chandrasekharan
- Starring: Siddique; Jagathy Sreekumar; Innocent; Vinaya Prasad; Baby Shamili
- Edited by: G. Murali
- Music by: S. P. Venkatesh
- Production company: Thandu Films
- Distributed by: Thandu Films
- Release date: 14 March 1996
- Country: India
- Language: Malayalam

Lalanam is a 1996 Indian Malayalam film, directed by Chandrasekharan. The film stars Siddique, Jagathy Sreekumar, Innocent and Vinaya Prasad in the lead roles. The film has musical score by S. P. Venkatesh.

== Cast ==
- Siddique as Vijayakumar
- Jagathy Sreekumar as Karuparambil Sunny
- Innocent as Dr. Sreekumaran Unnithan
- Vinaya Prasad as Sasikala Vijayakumar
- Baby Shamili as Ammu Vijayakumar
- Ragini as Priya Unnithan
- Shine Mohan
- Shanthi Krishna as Selina Sunny
- M. S. Thripunithura as Swamy
- Jose Pellissery as Adv. Sathyanathan
- N. F. Varghese as Adv. Rajedran
- M. G. Soman as Shekhara Menon
- Shankaradi as Madhavan Pilla
- Sukumari as Rugmini

== Soundtrack ==
The music was composed by S. P. Venkatesh and the lyrics were written by Gireesh Puthenchery.

No.	Song	Singers	Lyrics	Length (m:ss)
1	"Manjakkiliye"	K. S. Chithra	Gireesh Puthenchery	
2	"Manthravaadiyaay"	K. J. Yesudas, K. S. Chithra	Gireesh Puthenchery	
3	"Snehalaalanam"	K. J. Yesudas	Gireesh Puthenchery	
