= Karunamayi (film) =

- Directed by: H. R. Bhargava
- Screenplay by: P. Vasu
- Story by: Kesaru Mosaru by Kakolu Saroja Rao
- Produced by: H. R. Bhargava; D. V. Rajaram
- Starring: Vishnuvardhan; Bhavya; K. S. Ashwath; Tara
- Cinematography: D. V. Rajaram
- Edited by: Yadav Victor
- Music by: Rajan–Nagendra
- Production company: Kalakruthi
- Release date: 2 March 1987
- Running time: 137 minutes
- Country: India
- Language: Kannada

Karunamayi ( transl. Merciful) is a 1987 Indian Kannada-language action drama film directed and co-produced by H. R. Bhargava based on the Kannada novel Kesaru Mosaru by Kakolu Saroja Rao. The film starred Vishnuvardhan and Bhavya along with Tara, K. S. Ashwath and Shivakumar in supporting roles. The film's music is scored by Rajan–Nagendra whilst the cinematography is by D. V. Rajaram who also co-produced the film. Movie became a silver jubilee hit.

The director had revealed that Rajkumar had initially planned to make a film out of the novel on which this movie was based but later opted out after which Bhargava decided to adapt that novel on-screen. P. Vasu, who wrote the screenplay remade the movie in Tamil as Ponmana Selvan with Vijayakanth.

== Cast ==
- Vishnuvardhan as Raja
- Bhavya as Prema
- K. S. Ashwath as Subramanya Shastri, Raja's father
- Pandari Bai as Gowri, Shastri's wife
- Tara as Uma, Raja's sister
- Vishwa Vijetha as Ravi, Raja's brother
- Ramesh Bhat as Vishwanathaiah
- Doddanna as Patela
- Shivakumar as Raghu, Raja's brother
- Ravishankar
- Thimmayya
- Chikkanna

== Soundtrack ==
The music of the film was composed by Rajan–Nagendra and lyrics written by Chi. Udaya Shankar.

Track listing
| No. | Title | Lyrics | Singer(s) | Length |
|---|---|---|---|---|
| 1. | "Hejje Mele Hejje" | Chi. Udaya Shankar | S. P. Balasubrahmanyam, K. S. Chithra |
| 2. | "Preethiya Oleya" | Chi. Udaya Shankar | S. P. Balasubrahmanyam |
| 3. | "Manasali Bayasuvude Ondu" | Chi. Udaya Shankar | S. P. Balasubrahmanyam, K. S. Chithra |
| 4. | "Ooru Hegendu" | Chi. Udaya Shankar | S. P. Balasubrahmanyam |
| 5. | "Nammoora Cheluva" | Chi. Udaya Shankar | S. P. Balasubrahmanyam, K. S. Chithra, Rajan |
