= Bandhalu Anubandhalu =

- Theatrical poster
- Directed by: H. R. Bhargava
- Story by: Seetharam
- Based on: Thoondil Meen (Tamil)
- Starring: Shobhan Babu, Lakshmi, Chiranjeevi
- Music by: K. V. Mahadevan
- Release date: 26 November 1982
- Country: India
- Language: Telugu

Bandhalu Anubandhalu is a 1982 Indian Telugu-language film starring Sobhan Babu and Lakshmi with Chiranjeevi in a key special appearance. This is Chiranjeevi's 50th film. This is the remake of director H. R. Bhargava's own 1981 Kannada movie Avala Hejje which in turn was a remake of 1977 Tamil movie Thoondil Meen. Lakshmi was the heroine in all three versions.

== Plot ==
An inspector brings a patient who has lost his memory, to a psychiatrist. On the other hand, the inspector is investigating a case where the same patient was shot, and his prime suspects are the psychiatrist's wife and his compounder.

== Cast ==
- Shoban Babu
- Lakshmi
- Chiranjeevi
- Jaggayya
- Ranganath
- Mada
- Padmanabham
- Balakrishna
- C. H. Narayana Rao
- Pandari Bai

== Soundtrack ==
Soundtrack was composed by KV Mahadevan.

- Punnami Jabili - S. P. Balasubrahmanyam
- Sarigama - S. P. Balasubrahmanyam, P. Susheela
- Evadi Pichi - Ramesh, Ramola
- Unnadamma - P Susheela
