= Vaishakada Dinagalu =

- Directed by: Katte Ramachandra
- Written by: Anand (dialogues)
- Screenplay by: Katte-Anand
- Story by: Gayathri Sridhar
- Produced by: Mohan Bhasagoda
- Starring: Vishnuvardhan; Moon Moon Sen; Harshavardhan; Anjali Sudhakar; Vanitha Vasu
- Cinematography: P. Rajan
- Edited by: M. N. Swamy
- Music by: Indu Vishwanath
- Production company: Bhasagod Creations
- Distributed by: Bhasagod Creations
- Release date: 1 March 1993
- Running time: 120 min
- Country: India
- Language: Kannada

Vaishakada Dinagalu (Kannada: ವೈಶಾಖದ ದಿನಗಳು) is a 1993 Indian Kannada film, directed by Katte Ramachandra and produced by Mohan Bhasagoda. The film stars Vishnuvardhan, Moon Moon Sen, Harshavardhan and Vanitha Vasu in lead roles. The film had musical score by Indu Vishwanath.

== Cast ==
- Vishnuvardhan as Vishnu
- Moon Moon Sen as Rajani
- Harshavardhan as Vishwa
- Vanitha Vasu as Vanitha
- Anjali Sudhakar
- Thoogudeepa Srinivas as Inspector
- Avinash as Avinash
- Praveen Nayak
- Dr Sridhar
- Vilas Malai
- Ramadas
- Manju
- Ganesh Prasad
- Kishore Goankar
- Sathyananda
- Dhanpath
- Ravi Ganjagatti
- Kumari Pallavi Rao
- Master Deepak
