= Sammilana =

- Directed by: H. R. Bhargava
- Written by: Kunigal Nagabhushan
- Screenplay by: H. R. Bhargava
- Story by: Saisuthe (Based on Novel Sammilana)
- Produced by: S A Chinne Gowda; S A Srinivas
- Starring: Shashikumar; Shruti; K. S. Ashwath; Tara
- Cinematography: Mahendra Chittibabu
- Edited by: Manohar
- Music by: Hamsalekha
- Production company: Sri Vijayeshwari Art Combines
- Distributed by: Sri Vijayeshwari Art Combines
- Release date: 18 April 1994
- Running time: 127 min
- Country: India
- Language: Kannada

Sammilana (transl. Union) is a 1994 Indian Kannada-language film, directed by H. R. Bhargava and produced by S A Chinne Gowda and S A Srinivas. The film stars Shashikumar, Shruti, Tara, K. S. Ashwath and Sudheer in lead roles. The film had musical score by Hamsalekha. The film was adapted from novel of same name written by Sai Suthe.

== Cast ==
- Shashikumar
- Shruti
- K. S. Ashwath
- Tara
- Sudheer
- Sathyajith
- Aravind
- Prithviraj
- Balaraj
- Nagesh Yadav
- Abhinaya
- Baby Aishwarya
- Pandari Bai
- Girija Lokesh
- B. V. Radha
- Rekha Das
- Jaya
- Bhagyashree
- Madhavi
- Veena
- Asha
- Rathna
- Honnavalli Krishna
- Bank Janardhan
- Chikkanna
- Shani Mahadevappa
- Kunigal Nagabhushan
- Ashwath Narayan
- Vijanath Biradar
- Kunigal Ramanath
