= Suli (2016 film) =

- Theatrical release poster
- Directed by: P. H. Vishwanath
- Screenplay by: P. H. Vishwanath
- Story by: P. H. Vishwanath
- Produced by: Geetha Srinath; T. S. Sathyanarayan
- Starring: Srinath; Pragati Soorve; Jayaram Neenasam; Rahul Sreenivasan
- Cinematography: R. Manjunath
- Edited by: B. S. Kemparaju
- Music by: S. P. Venkatesh
- Production company: Diya Communications Pvt. Ltd.
- Release date: 27 May 2016
- Running time: 115 minutes
- Country: India
- Language: Kannada

Suli (The Whirlpool) is a 2016 Indian Kannada film written and directed by P. H. Vishwanath, and produced by Geetha Srinath and T. S. Sathyanarayan. It stars Srinath and Pragati Soorve in the lead roles. The supporting cast features Jayaram Neenasam, Chennakeshava, Susheelamma, Rahul Sreenivasan, Adhvithi Shetty and Ashvithi Shetty. Vishwanath revealed that Budensabi, the character portrayed by Srinath, is inspired from an article about a village on top of the hill in Uttara Kannada, where a saintly person transports materials needed for daily life on donkeys.

== Cast ==
- Srinath as Budensab
- Pragati Soorve as Shabana
- Jayaram Neenasam as Wasim
- Chennakeshava as Mathadayya
- Susheelamma as Saira
- Adhvithi Shetty as Saleena
- Ashvithi Shetty as Sadiya
- Rahul Sreenivasan as Aazim
- Harsha Nalwad as Inayat

== Production ==
The developments of the film were revealed on the media only later into filming, in May 2016, when The Times of India carrying a report that Srinath would be appearing in the lead role in the film. Speaking of his character, Vishwanath said, "Srinath plays a Muslim man for the first time in his career. He plays a simple family man living in a remote village, surrounded by people from different religious backgrounds." Requiring the former to sport beard for his role, the filming which was supposed to commence in October 2015 was delayed. Pragati A S, a radio jockey, was signed to play the female protagonist. She was chosen after a round of auditions, which she was told to by her college professor. In preparation for her role as a speech-impaired daughter of Srinath's character, she was made to go through a "15-day workshop ..., during which [she] spent time with a Muslim family to observe the way they interacted with each other, and, most importantly, prayed." Adhvithi and Ashwithi Shetty, who had previously appeared Mr. and Mrs. Ramachari (2014), were cast to play the second and third daughters of Srinath's character.

== Soundtrack ==
Suli

Soundtrack album by S. P. Venkatesh
- Released: 6 April 2016
- Genre: Feature film soundtrack
- Length: 14:56
- Label: Anand Audio

S. P. Venkatesh composed the film's music and the soundtrack, lyrics for which were penned by Na Damodara Shetty and Srichandru. The soundtrack album consists of five tracks.

Track listing
No.	Title	Lyrics	Singer(s)	Length
1.	"Thoreya Neerali Naliva Bettavu"	Na Damodara Shetty	Ankur Anil Sharma	4:32
2.	"Baana Mareyinda Holeva Chandira"	Na Damodara Shetty	Pratheeksha Bhat	2:28
3.	"Sootravu Avanali"	Srichandru	Ankur Anil Sharma	1:32
4.	"Harushada Pallavi Jothe"	Srichandru	Pratheeksha Bhat	1:23
5.	"Manshna Baara Hottu"	Srichandru	Ankur Anil Sharma	4:51
Total length:				14:56

== Reception ==
Upon theatrical release, the film received positive reviews from critics. Shashidhara, reviewing for Vijaya Karnataka felt that the message conveyed by the protagonist in the film is that the welfare of the society is of paramount importance than anything else. He wrote praises of Srinath's performance and felt that its he who "carries the film on his shoulders" and commended the performance of Pragati A S as well. He concluded crediting the roles of the music including the "timely tracks", cinematography and the film's direction.
