= Bhavya =

Indian actress

Bhavya Patel
- Born: Bangalore, Karnataka, India
- Occupation: Actress
- Years active: 1983 - present
- Spouse: Mukesh Patel
- Children: 1
- Awards: Karnataka State Film Awards

Bhavya Patel is an Indian actress who predominantly works in Kannada films apart from a few Tamil and Telugu films. She was a top heroine of Kannada cinema during 1985–1992. She switched over to key supporting roles post 2000.

She is settled in Mumbai, India and travels frequently to Bangalore for her shoots.

== Career ==
Bhavya Patel began her career with the Siddalingaiah directorial Prema Parva opposite Murali in 1983. This was followed by the role of Vishnuvardhan's sister in the multi-starrer Kallu Veene Nudiyitu. She next starred in a glamorous role in the V. Ravichandran starrer Pralayantaka and played the harassed daughter-in-law in the Baddi Bangaramma followed by several medium budget movies with newcomers of the time like Vinod Kumar, Vijayakashi, Charan Raj and Arjun Sarja. She also worked in Tamil and Telugu films including Geethanjali with Murali. Her big break to the top league came in the form of the heroine's role opposite superstar Vishnuvardhan in Nee Bareda Kadambari for which she was widely acclaimed. The success of major commercial films such as Krishna Nee Begane Baro, Sangrama, Avale Nanna Hendthi and Ravana Raajya in quick succession established her as the top actress of Kannada cinema.

Bhavya Patel has acted opposite all the leading actors of 1980s and 1990s. Her pairing with Vishnuvardhan in one movie a year from 1985 to 1992 resulted in a string of hits including Karunamayi, Hrudaya Geethe and Mathe Haditu Kogile. She starred with Ambareesh in six films including the acclaimed Hrudaya Haadithu. With Anant Nag she starred in several romantic films and social dramas. Her pairing with action hero Shankar Nag was the most prolific, including the acclaimed Sangliyana series and several masala entertainers. She acted opposite V. Ravichandran in three films during the initial phase of their respective careers and gave Kashinath the biggest hit of his career with Avale Nanna Hendthi. She however never got a chance to act opposite Raj Kumar as she was considered too young for him. She acted with newer actors like Shashi Kumar and Ram Kumar in the later years of her career as a lead heroine. She has acted in 5-6 hit films of acclaimed director H. R. Bhargava and earned the tag of lucky heroine.

After 2001 Bhavya switched over to supporting roles mainly playing mother to younger actors. Her sensitive portrayals as Dhyan's mother in Nanna Preethiya Hudugi and Ramya's mother in Amrithadhare, both directed by the famous Nagathihalli Chandrashekhar, warrant special mention. Bhavya has also worked in television daily series such as Durga.

== Selected filmography ==
| Year | Film | Role | Notes |
|---|---|---|---|
| 1983 | Prema Parva | Sarasa | Debut |
| 1983 | Kalluveene Nudiyithu | | Supporting role |
| 1983 | Swaragadalli Maduve | | |
| 1984 | Baddi Bangaramma | Bhagyalakshmi | |
| 1984 | Prema Jyothi | | |
| 1984 | Pralayanthaka | | |
| 1984 | Hosabaalu | | |
| 1984 | Odeda Haalu | | |
| 1985 | Maruthi Mahime | | |
| 1985 | Geethanjali | Julie | Tamil film |
| 1985 | Janani | Janani | Tamil film |
| 1985 | Nee Bareda Kadambari | Prema | |
| 1985 | Na Ninna Preetisuve | Hema | |
| 1985 | Mavano Aliyano | | |
| 1986 | Punyasthree | | Telugu film |
| 1986 | Prema Gange | | |
| 1986 | Tavaru Mane | | |
| 1986 | Namma Oora Devathe | | |
| 1986 | Ella Hengasirinda | | |
| 1986 | Sedina Sanchu | | |
| 1986 | Preethi | Asha | |
| 1986 | Agni Pareekshe | | |
| 1986 | Krishna Nee Begane Baro | Radha | |
| 1987 | Karunamayi | | |
| 1987 | Inspector Kranthikumar | | |
| 1987 | Sangrama | | |
| 1987 | Huli Hebbuli | | |
| 1987 | Ravana Rajya | | |
| 1987 | Thayi | Malathi | |
| 1987 | Daiva Shakthi | Seetha | |
| 1987 | Kurukshethra | | |
| 1987 | Satthva Pareekshe | | |
| 1987 | Lorry Driver | Lakshmi | |
| 1987 | Bedi | | |
| 1988 | Thayiya Aase | | |
| 1988 | Avale Nanna Hendthi | Uma | |
| 1988 | Sangliyana | Kanchana | |
| 1988 | Muthhaide | | |
| 1988 | Jana Nayaka | | |
| 1988 | Bhumi Thayane | | |
| 1988 | Ladies Hostel | Radha | Cameo |
| 1989 | Hrudaya Geethe | Dr. Aruna | |
| 1989 | Justice Rajendra | | |
| 1989 | Raja Simha | Mala | |
| 1989 | Jayabheri | Janaki | |
| 1989 | Amanusha | | |
| 1990 | Mathe Haditu Kogile | Kavitha | |
| 1990 | Aavesha | | |
| 1990 | S. P. Sangliyana Part 2 | Kanchana Sangliana | |
| 1990 | Halliya Surasararu | Shantha | |
| 1991 | Prema Pareekshe | Suma | |
| 1991 | Hrudaya Haadithu | Dr. Abhilasha | |
| 1991 | Puksatte Ganda Hotte Thumba Unda | | |
| 1991 | Lion Jagapathi Rao | Lawyer Gayatri | |
| 1991 | Hosamane Aliya | | |
| 1992 | Pruthviraj | Madhavi | |
| 1992 | Ravivarma | Pavithra | |
| 1992 | Solillada Saradara | Rukmini | |
| 1993 | Kollura Sri Mookambika | Chandraprabha | |
| 1993 | Praana Snehita | | |
| 1994 | Shivraj | | |
| 1995 | Revenge | | |
| 1995 | Nilukada Nakshatra | Dr. Saraladevi | |
| 1995 | Hosa Baduku | | |
| 2001 | Nanna Preethiya Hudugi | Seetha | Comeback |
| 2002 | Kitty | Yamuna | |
| 2003 | Thayi Illada Thabbali | | |
| 2004 | Monalisa | Sarasu | |
| 2005 | Auto Shankar | | |
| 2005 | Dr. B. R. Ambedkar | Savita Ambedkar | |
| 2005 | Gadipaar | | |
| 2005 | Amrithadhare | Amritha's mother | |
| 2005 | Moorkha | | |
| 2006 | Miss California | | |
| 2006 | 7 O' Clock | Rahul's mother | |
| 2006 | Odahuttidavalu | | |
| 2007 | Sajni | Ananth Murthy's sister | |
| 2007 | Preethigaagi | Sanju's mother | |
| 2007 | Jambada Hudugi | | |
| 2007 | Tangiya Mane | | |
| 2008 | Gange Baare Tunge Baare | | |
| 2008 | Manasugula Mathu Madhura | | |
| 2008 | Gooli | | |
| 2010 | Nooru Janmaku | | |
| 2012 | Gokula Krishna | | |
| 2013 | Mandahasa | | |
| 2014 | Prema Ledani | | Telugu film |
| 2015 | Shivam | | |
| 2015 | Billa | | |
| 2015 | Geetha Bangle Store | | |
| 2015 | Luv U Alia | | |
| 2015 | Prema Pallakki | | |
| 2016 | Aham | | |
| 2016 | Chakravyuha | | |
| 2016 | 1944 | | |
| 2016 | Nada Rakshaka | | |
| 2016 | Mareyadiru Endendu | | |
| 2017 | Hosa Anubhava | | |
| 2017 | Krishna S/O CM | | |
| 2018 | Raja Loves Radhe | Seethamma | |
| 2018 | Amma Ninagagi | | |
| 2019 | Payana | | |
| 2019 | 10ne Tharagathi | | |
| 2020 | Ojas | | |
| 2020 | Naragunda Bandaya | | |
| 2021 | Rajatantra | | |
| 2021 | Avatara Purusha | Susheela | |
| 2022 | Nilukada Thare | | |
| 2022 | Aa Thombatthu Dinagalu | | |
| 2022 | Avatara Purusha | | |
| 2022 | Namma Hudugaru | | |
| 2022 | Karmanye Vadhikarasthe | | |
| 2022 | Rudheera Kanive | | |
| 2023 | Miss Nandini | | Guest Appearance |
| 2023 | Parimala D'Souza | | |
| 2023 | Olave Mandara 2 | Susheela | |
| 2023 | Naa Kolikke Ranga | | |
| 2024 | Namo Bharath | | |
| 2024 | Avatara Purusha 2 | | |
| 2024 | Sambhavami Yuge Yuge | | |
| 2025 | Nimbiya Banada Myaga Page 1 | | |
| 2025 | Bullet | | |
| 2025 | Athani | | |
| 2026 | Educated Bulls | | |
| 2026 | Kaalaghatta | | |
| TBA | Koragajja | | |
