= Pritha Hari =

Indian businesswoman and former actress (born 1983)

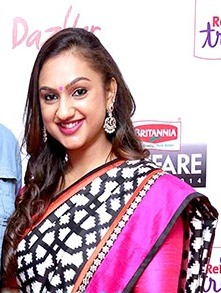
- Pritha in 2015
- Born: Preetha Vijayakumar; 10 January 1983 (age 43); Thanjavur, Tamil Nadu, India
- Other name: Preetha Vijayakumar
- Occupations: Actress; Businesswoman
- Years active: 1997–2002
- Spouse: Hari (m. 2002)
- Children: 3
- Parents: Vijayakumar; Manjula Vijayakumar
- Relatives: Sridevi Vijayakumar (Sister); Vanitha Vijayakumar (Sister); Arun Vijay (Half-brother)

Pritha Hari (née Vijayakumar; born 10 January 1983) is an Indian businesswoman and former actress who predominantly acted in Tamil, Telugu and Malayalam films. After her marriage to film director Hari, she retired from the film industry in 2002.

== Early life ==
Pritha is the second daughter of Tamil actor Vijayakumar and his second wife, Tamil actress Manjula. She has two sisters, Vanitha and Sridevi, who are also actresses. From his first marriage to Muthukannu Vellalar, Vijayakumar had three children: actor Arun Vijay, Anitha and Kavitha.

== Career ==
Pritha had first signed up to portray the leading role in Ravi Raja Pinisetty's Telugu film Rukmini opposite Vineeth in 1997, and she made her Tamil film debut with Sandhippoma in 1998. She is noted for her role in the movie Padayappa as Rajinikanth's daughter.

== Personal life ==
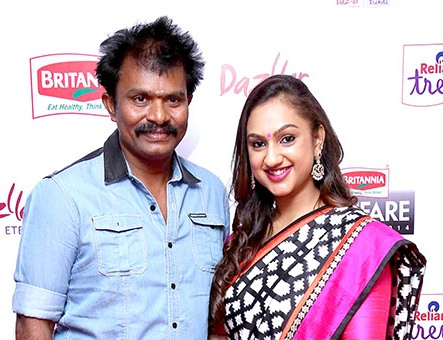
Preetha with her husband Hari.

She married director Hari in 2002 and they have three sons.

== Filmography ==
Year	Film	Role	Language	Notes
1997	Rukmini	Rukmini	Telugu	credited as Rukmini
1998	Sandhippoma	Nilani	Tamil	
1998	Dharma	Sharmila	Tamil	
1999	Ponnu Veettukaaran	Indu	Tamil	
1999	Padayappa	Anita	Tamil	
1999	Suyamvaram	Hema Kuselan	Tamil	
1999	Wife	Kranti	Telugu	
1999	Om Namah Shivaya	Gowri	Kannada	
1999	Udayapuram Sulthan	Gopika	Malayalam	Malayalam Debut
1999	Red Indians	Preetha	Malayalam	
2000	Kakkai Siraginilae	Gayatri	Tamil	
2000	Maa Annayya	Sumathi	Telugu	
2000	Kshemamga Velli Labhamga Randi	Janaki	Telugu	
2001	Priyamaina Neeku	Sirisha	Telugu	
2001	Chandu		Telugu	
2001	Dubai	Alice	Malayalam	
2002	Alli Arjuna	Nisha	Tamil	
2002	Punnagai Desam	Nandhini	Tamil	
2002	Snehithan	Ann Mary	Malayalam	Final film
