= Kakkai Siraginilae =

- Title card
- Directed by: P. Vasu
- Screenplay by: P. Vasu
- Story by: Kalaignanam
- Produced by: G. V. Anandhan
- Starring: Parthiban; Preetha Vijayakumar
- Cinematography: R. Raghunatha Reddy
- Edited by: P. Mohanraj
- Music by: Ilaiyaraaja
- Production company: Anand Movie Land
- Release date: 10 March 2000
- Running time: 143 minutes
- Country: India
- Language: Tamil

Kakkai Siraginilae (transl. Wings of the crow) is a 2000 Indian Tamil-language drama film written and directed by P. Vasu. The film stars Parthiban and Preetha Vijayakumar, while Manasa, K. Viswanath, Lakshmi, Visu, and Vadivelu play supporting roles. The music was composed by Ilaiyaraaja with editing by P. Mohanraj and cinematography by R. Raghunatha Reddy. The film was released on 10 March 2000.

== Plot ==
Vellaisamy is an orphan who was brought up by a Brahmin couple, Sambasiva Iyer and Savithri. Vellaisamy is loyal and attached to the old couple. They also look after Vellaisamy as their own son. Gayatri is the only daughter of the couple who returns from the city after completing her education. Vellaisamy is very much attached to Gayatri also, and he looks after her as a child. Kanmani is a local worker who develops an affection for Vellaisamy upon being impressed by his good nature. Suddenly, Savithri passes away due to cardiac arrest. Sambasiva is left stunned by his wife's death, and Vellaisamy takes care of him. Meanwhile, the villagers talk ill about the relationship between Vellaisamy and Gayatri. At one instant, even Sambasiva is angered upon hearing the comments made by the public. Later, he understands the pure bonding shared between Vellaisamy and Gayatri. He feels bad for doubting them and also suddenly passes away. Gayatri is left alone following her parents' death, and Vellaisamy decides to take care of her until she marries. Vellaisamy takes the responsibility of getting Gayatri married to the person she likes. He approaches a judge with a marriage proposal between Gayatri and the judge's son. The judge is also interested in the proposal as he is surprised to see a person who takes all the effort to get someone married who is not related to him. However, on the day of the marriage, a few people came to the wedding hall and made some bad comments about Vellaisamy and Gayatri. The judge suddenly asks Vellaisamy and ties the knot with Gayatri. Everyone is shocked, including Vellaisamy and Gayatri. Now, the judge reveals that he knows very well that the relationship that exists between Vellaisamy and Gayatri is pure, which can be seen based on their reaction hearing of marriage arrangements between them. The judge says that he has the ability to judge people based on their expressions. He says that he trusts the relationship between Vellaisamy and Gayatri. Gayatri eventually marries the judge's son.

== Cast ==
- Parthiban as Vellaichamy
- Preetha Vijayakumar as Gayatri
- Manasa as Kanmani
- K. Viswanath as Sambasiva Iyer (voice dubbed by Delhi Kumar)
- Lakshmi as Savithri
- Visu as Viswanathan Iyer Judge
- Vadivelu
- C. R. Saraswathi as Viswanathan Iyer's wife
- Satya Prakash as Sulur Subramaniam, Gayatri's cousin
- Cochin Haneefa as Kanmani's father
- Rajeev as Nomads Mestri
- Mohan Raman as Iyer
- S. S. Chandran as Vaithiyanathan Iyer
- Kavitha as Vaithiyanathan Iyer's wife
- Thyagu as Vaithiyanathan son
- Pandu as Pannaiyar
- Gowthami Vembunathan
- S. S. R. Kannan as Viswanathan Iyer's son

== Production ==
The filming was held at Pollachi and Udumalai in 1998. Its title is derived from a poem by Subramania Bharati. Actress Vanitha Vijayakumar worked as an assistant director for this film.

== Soundtrack ==
The music was composed by Ilaiyaraaja, with lyrics written by R. V. Udayakumar. Venky of Chennai Online wrote, "Two people have made this album worth buying - Illayaraja and S.P. Balasubrahmanyam. Illayaraja is in his elements in the songs sung by SPB and the singer complements the composer by rendering them true to form".

| Song | Singer(s) | Duration |
|---|---|---|
| "Kolakailiye" | S. P. Balasubrahmanyam | 5:16 |
| "Gayathiri Ketkum" | Bhavatharini, Unnikrishnan | 5:02 |
| "Paadi Thirintha" | S. P. Balasubrahmanyam | 4:32 |
| "Paadi Thirintha" | Ilaiyaraaja | 4:32 |
| "Nenavu Therinja" | Mano, K. S. Chithra | 5:08 |
| "Oor Oora" | Sandhya | 4:47 |
| "Orancharam" | S. P. Balasubrahmanyam | 4:52 |

== Reception ==
K. N. Vijiyan of New Straits Times wrote, "If you must find a reason to see it, then it must be for the wit of this reputed director-actor", but felt the songs were hampering the narrative. Malathi Rangarajan of The Hindu wrote, "It is heartening to note that director P. Vasu shows that there are both good and bad people in the world and caste and community have nothing to do with it. A healthy trend indeed". Indiainfo wrote, "It is hard to believe that a director like P Vasu, who churned out melodramatic stuff and gave hits with Chinna Thambi, has not realised that the trend has changed and repeating old stuff is only suicidal for him". Malini of Chennai Online wrote "Vasu seems to have exhausted all his original ideas. The film seems to be a combination of scenes from films like 'Bharathi Kannamma', 'Natpukkaga', and the director's own 'Ponnu Veetukaran'. So there is a sense of Déjà vu throughout". Dinakaran wrote "The way in which director P.Vasu has handled this subject reminds us of his good old film "Ponnu Veettukkaaran" and also the particular film titled "Ponnumani", acted by Karthik. In the process of making some of the scenes become impregnated with sharp punches, they are made to get soaked in the over-dose of artificiality. The moment Viswanath comes to suspect Parthiban, the scenes start moving with great speed".
