= Pruthviraj (film) =

1992 Kannada film by Renuka Sharma

- Title card of the film
- Directed by: Renuka Sharma
- Written by: Renuka Sharma; Madhukar; Veerappa Maralavadi
- Produced by: M. S. Suresh Babu
- Starring: Devaraj; Bhavya
- Cinematography: S. V. Shrikanth
- Edited by: R. Shyam Yadav
- Music by: Sax Raja
- Production company: Swathi Cine Arts
- Release date: 12 February 1992
- Running time: 134 minutes
- Country: India
- Language: Kannada

Pruthviraj is a 1992 Indian Kannada-language action film co-written and directed by Renuka Sharma. The film was financed by M. S. Suresh Babu under Swathi Cine Arts and had music scored and composed by Sax Raja. The film stars Devaraj in the titular role alongside Bhavya, Avinash, Shanti and Padma Kumta.

The film follows a young man who after an accident loses his memory and comes across different people addressing him by two different names. While one name offers family and protection the other causes trouble. How the man confirms his identity and retraces his lost memory forms the crux of the story.

== Plot ==
A young man driving an ambassador car is chased by a biker gang. When the car crashes into a tree, a police jeep which passes by notices him and takes him to the hospital. Inspector Rajasekhar who happened to be there in the jeep learns from the doctor that the accident caused a major head injury for the person resulting in temporary memory loss. In order to find who he is, Rajasekhar publishes his photo in all the major newspapers. The next day three people arrive. The first person is a young woman, Kavitha, who claims to be the victim, Keerthi's girlfriend. Danappa, the second person tells he is Keerthi's father while the third one, an inspector calls Keerthi a wanted criminal. However, the three of them not knowing each other arises suspicion in the mind of Rajasekhar who believes the person (perhaps Keerthi) is faking his memory loss and hence places a microphone beneath his bed. One night he is attacked by some mysterious person after Keerthi fails to provide information regarding some black diary. After another attack, Keerthi runs away from the hospital not intending to meet any of them again causing Rajasekhar to believe that he has been abducted.

While walking aimlessly he comes across Swathi, a small girl, who calls him her father and takes him to her house where her grandmother calls him as Pruthvi, her only son. This fact is refuted by Pruthvi's wife, Madhavi who claims to have cremated her own husband. She reveals how he went missing on a picnic forcing them to inform the police who takes her to a hospital morgue the very next day only for her to discover her husband's corpse. This happened a few days back. However, she is forced to keep him there as both Swathi and her mother-in-law refuses to believe her. Keerthi/Pruthvi begins to have a paternal relation with Swathi which disturbs Madhavi who asks him to go out. As he moves on again, aimlessly and hopelessly, he comes across Menagha, who happens to be one of those queer agents sent by some Boss to retrieve the Black Diary. After escaping from them he returns to Pruthvi's house where Madhavi asks him to stay there until Swathi gets to know the truth. Meanwhile, Police Constable Siddharama posing as a beggar traces Pruthvi/Keerthi's location and informs Rajasekhar who makes a visit to the house right away. With Madhavi's help Pruthvi/Keerthi somewhat convinces Rajasekhar that he is Pruthvi. One day when they travel to temple, Pruthvi/Keerthi runs back to the house upon seeing Kavitha. A few agents who had followed Pruthvi/Keerthi to the temple kidnaps Swathi ordering Madhavi to ask Keerthi to handover the black diary. They give their location. Keerthi/Pruthvi heads to that place only to be captured and tortured.

Rajasekhar, in the meantime, contacts Kavitha and Danappa and sends them to Pruthvi's house where Danappa recognises Pruthvi's mother as his late master's wife and reveals Keerthi to be Pruthvi's twin brother. The story cuts to a flashback. Two crime lords, Giridhar and Chakravarthy (Boss), attacks Maheshwarappa, the father of Pruthvi and Keerthi, and Danappa after Maheshwarappa, an honest police officer, arrests and humiliates them. They leave after asking their henchmen to put the house on fire. Danappa manages to escape with Keerthi while Pruthvi and his mother who had gone to the nearby temple returns to see the burning mansion believing all the three of them to be dead. Confirming that the person is Keerthi, Rajasekhar decides to travel to the mysterious location of Chakravarthy with armed forces.

Keerthi who gets a major blow on his head from one of Chakravarthy's henchman regains his memory. On the day of picnic when Pruthvi went to fetch some water he came across an injured Keerthi. The latter recognises Pruthvi as his elder twin brother and convinces about how he is his estranged brother. Keerthi narrates that he was raised by Danappa after their father got killed with the sole intention of avenging his murder. As an adult, he manages to be a loyal member of Chakravarthy's gang and after killing Giridhar flees with the mysterious Black Diary which contains the complete information regarding Chakravarthy's global crime syndicate. He is, however, chased by the latter's goons who shoot him forcing him to take shelter there. Before dying he gives the Black Diary to Pruthvi asking him to hand over it to the Government authorities. While trying to escape from Chakravarthy's goons Pruthvi comes across an Ambassador car and escapes in that. It was after this that he met with the accident.

Confirming that he is Pruthvi, he breaks free from captivity and kills Chakravarthy's goons. After saving his daughter he thrashes Chakravarthy. Rajasekhar who arrives with Pruthvi's family and the police prevents Pruthvi from killing Chakravarthy. Pruthvi reveals the truth to everyone and reveals to Chakravarthy that he is Maheshwarappa's son. Kavitha sacrifices her life to protect Pruthvi from one of Chakravarthy's severely wounded henchman. Pruthvi reveals to Rajasekhar that the Black Diary is hidden in the ceiling of the Ambassador car he had driven that day. The family is reunited.

== Cast ==
- Devaraj — Pruthviraj and Keerthiraj (Double Role)
- Bhavya — Madhavi
- Avinash — Inspector Rajasekhar
- Padma Kumta as Pruthvi's mother
- Bharat Bhagavathar as Danappa
- Shanti as Kavitha
- Mysore Lokesh as Giridhar
- Tennis Krishna as Siddharama
- Sundar Krishna Urs as Maheshwarappa
- Lambu Nagesh as Goon
- Abhilasha as Menagha

== Music ==
Pruthviraj

Soundtrack album by Sax Raja
- Released: 31 August 1992
- Recorded: 1992
- Studio: Prasad Recording Studios
- Genre: Feature film soundtrack
- Language: Kannada
- Label: Lahari Music

Sax Raja chronology
Ranachandi (1991)	Pruthviraj (1992)	Abhijith (1993)

Singles from Pruthviraj
- 1. "Maavu Sihiya Maavu"

The film had its soundtrack album scored and composed by Sax Raja. The album comprised 4 songs with one being a single.

=== Tracks ===
- "Chandada Nandavana" sung by K. J. Yesudas and K. S. Chitra
- "Banni Kanna Mucche" sung by K. J. Yesudas, Kasturi Shankar and Baby Archana
- "Adhe Saagara" sung by K. J. Yesudas and K. S. Chitra
- "Maavu Sihiya Maavu" by Latha Hamsalekha
