= Shiva Mecchida Kannappa =

1988 film by Vijay

- Video cover
- Directed by: Vijay
- Produced by: S. A. Govindaraj; Raghavendra Rajkumar
- Starring: Rajkumar; Shivarajkumar; Geetha; Sarala Devi
- Cinematography: R. Chitti Babu
- Edited by: P. Bhakthavathsalam
- Music by: T. G. Lingappa
- Release date: 24 March 1988
- Running time: 149 minutes
- Country: India
- Language: Kannada

Shiva Mecchida Kannappa (transl. Kannappa who was blessed by Shiva) is a 1988 Indian Kannada-language film directed by Vijay. The film is a rehashed version of the 1954 film Bedara Kannappa, the debut film of actor Rajkumar. Produced by Raghavendra Rajkumar, the film is about the life of Kannappa, a hunter who becomes a Lord Shiva devotee; Kanappa is played by Puneeth Rajkumar in younger days and Shivarajkumar in adult life. The rest of the cast includes Geetha, Sarala Devi, C. R. Simha and Rajkumar himself playing a brief cameo role in the role of Shiva. The film has musical score by T. G. Lingappa and the dialogues and lyrics written by Chi. Udaya Shankar.

== Cast ==
- Rajkumar as Shiva (cameo)
- Shiva Rajkumar as Dinna / Arjuna
- Puneeth Rajkumar as young Dinna
- Geetha as Parvati
- Saraladevi as Neela
- C. R. Simha as Kailasanatha Sastry
- Balaraj as Kashi
- Shankar Patil
- Doddanna as Doddayya
- Sathyajith as Neela's father
- Bhatti Mahadevappa
- Kunigal Ramanath
- Sangeeta
- Srishailan
- Honnavalli Krishna
- Upasane Seetharam
- Padma Kumta as Chenni, Dinna's mother

== Soundtrack ==
The music was composed by T. G. Lingappa.

Song	Singers	Lyrics
"Kanninda Nee Baana"	S. P. Balasubrahmanyam, B. R. Chaya	Chi. Udaya Shankar
"Mella Mellane Bandane"	Vani Jairam	Chi. Udaya Shankar
"Kannilla Kiviyilla"	S. P. Balasubrahmanyam	Chi. Udaya Shankar
"Maayeya Thareyanu"	Rajkumar	Chi. Udaya Shankar
"Deva Mahadeva"	S. P. Balasubrahmanyam	Chi. Udaya Shankar
"Ellaru Maduvudu"	Rajkumar	Kanaka Dasa

== External source ==
- Shiva Mecchida Kannappa at IMDb
