= S. P. Sangliyana Part 2 =

S. P. Sangliana Part 2
- Promotional poster
- Directed by: P. Nanjundappa
- Written by: K.V. Raju, P. Nanjundappa
- Screenplay by: K.V. Raju
- Story by: K.V. Raju
- Produced by: Krishna Raju and Friends
- Starring: Shankar Nag; Bhavya; Shivaranjini; Devaraj
- Cinematography: Mallikarjun
- Edited by: K. Balu
- Music by: Hamsalekha
- Production company: Swarnagiri Movies
- Release date: 1990
- Running time: 115 minutes
- Country: India
- Language: Kannada

S. P. Sangliyana Part 2 is a 1990 Kannada action drama film, directed and written by P. Nanjundappa. It is a sequel to the 1988 film Sangliyana. The film stars Shankar Nag, Bhavya and Shivaranjini in the lead roles. The film was produced under Swarnagiri Movies banner and the music was scored and composed by Hamsalekha. The film was a blockbuster at the Kannada box office, the biggest hit of Shankar Nag's career. According to reports, the film was watched by 1,84,150 people over the course of 9 weeks at the Kapali theatre.

The film re-released in theatres in November 2022, 32 years after it was first released on March 19, 1990. The film also marked an important phase in the way cops were portrayed in Kannada films. Sangliyana Part 3 was made in 1997. The film was dubbed into Telugu as Police Belt.

== Cast ==
- Shankar Nag as S. P. Sangliana
- Bhavya as Kanchana Sangliana
- Shivaranjini as Ranjini
- Devaraj as Vikram Vicky
- Ashok as Police Commissioner
- Mukhyamantri Chandru as Dhanraj
- Vajramuni MLA Nagappa
- Master Manjunath as Avinash
- Kunigal Nagabhushan
- Jai Jagadish Inspector Kiran (extended cameo appearance)
- Shashikumar Fake CBI Officer
- Avinash as Fake CBI Officer
- Lohithaswa as Mahesh
- Sudheer as Kumbhi
- Mysore Lokesh
- Lakshmi Chandrashekar
- Negro Johnny

== Soundtrack ==
S. P. Sangliyana Part 2

Soundtrack album by Hamsalekha
- Released: 1990
- Genre: Feature film soundtrack
- Label: Lahari Music

The music was composed and the lyrics were written by Hamsalekha. The album consists of five tracks.

Track listing
No.	Title	Lyrics	Singer(s)	Length
1.	"Tu Tu Tu Tu"	Hamsalekha	Mano, Latha Hamsalekha
2.	"Meru Giriyane"	Hamsalekha	K. J. Yesudas, Rathnamala Prakash
3.	"Ondu Muthinantha"	Hamsalekha	Manjula Gururaj
4.	"Ramaiah Ramaiah Nee"	Hamsalekha	Manjula Gururaj, B. R. Chaya, Latha Hamsalekha
5.	"Maiyella Kannidda Obba"	Hamsalekha	Manjula Gururaj
