= Olave (film) =

Indian Kannada-language [romantic drama film

- VCD cover
- Directed by: P. H. Vishwanath
- Written by: Padma Hemanth (dialogue)
- Screenplay by: P. H. Vishwanath
- Story by: P. H. Vishwanath
- Produced by: G Karunakara Reddy; P. H. Vishwanath; Rajendra (Mani); Babu Reddy
- Starring: Vishal Hegde; Harish; Sandhya
- Cinematography: B S Shastry
- Edited by: B S Kemparaju
- Music by: Hemanth
- Production company: Cinema Company
- Release date: 21 January 2005
- Country: India
- Language: Kannada

Olave (transl. Oh love) is a 2005 Indian Kannada-language romantic drama film directed by P. H. Vishwanath and starring Vishal Hegde, Harish and Sandhya.

== Plot ==
Vishal falls in love with Sandhya, who will be teaching Kannada to her relatives from America. Her father gives ₹3 lakh to Sandhya and asks her to forget Vishal, who is disturbed and goes to Madikeri. There, he finds Sandhya with her new lover Harish. How Sandhya goes back to Vishal despite being with Harish forms the rest of the story.

== Cast ==
- Vishal Hegde as Vishal
- Harish as Harish
- Sandhya as Sandhya
- Nagendra Shah
- Lambu Nagesh as Sandhya's father
- Ashok Kumar
- Babu Reddy
- Prashanth
- Sushma Shetty
- Uma Rao
- Baby Sheethal

== Production ==
The film was jointly co-produced by Babu Reddy and G Karunakara Reddy. All of the actors in the film were narrated the story by director P. H. Vishwanath fifteen days before the film started shooting. The actors were trained in acting by Ashok Kumar. Music director Hemanth Kumar and Hema Prabhath's brother Harish Prabhath made their debut through this film. The film is a triangular love story between Vishal Hegde, Harish Prabhath and Sandhya's characters. What happens after Vishal Hegde and Sandhya's character separates was the plot point that Vishwanath wanted to highlight. The film was shot at the ADA Rangamandira auditorium in Bengaluru on 11 June 2002. In mid-2002, the film's shoot was planned to take place in Anegundi, Chitradurga, Hiriyur and Madikeri.

== Soundtrack ==
The music was composed by Hemanth. The lyrics were written by V. Manohar and Padma Hemanth.

- "Kanyakumari Kanyakumari" - Rajesh Krishnan
- "Andadalli Andavo"
- "Kalittha Hudugi" - Yashwanth Halebandi, Mohan, Kusuma
- "Pallavi Pallavi"
- "Kushalave Kshemave" - Hemanth, Nanditha
- "Geethanjali Cheluva"
- "Manase Manase"

== Release ==
The film was released on 21 June 2005 after a two-and-a-half year delay. The delay of the film meant that Vishal Hegde already had six releases and that Khushi became Harish Prabhath's debut. The film was a box office failure and only ran for one week at Sapna Theatre, Bengaluru.
