= Sandhippoma =

- Poster
- Directed by: T. Indrakumar
- Screenplay by: T. Indrakumar
- Story by: T. Indrakumar
- Produced by: J. Vijayan; S. Raja; R. B. Choudary
- Starring: Suriya; Preetha Vijayakumar
- Cinematography: R. Rathnavelu
- Music by: Deva
- Production company: Golden Picture
- Distributed by: Super Good Films
- Release date: 9 July 1998
- Country: India
- Language: Tamil

Sandhippoma (transl. Shall we meet?) is a 1998 Indian Tamil-language romantic drama film directed by Indrakumar (in his directoral debut). The film stars Suriya and Preetha Vijayakumar in the lead roles, while Radhika, Prakash Raj, Sarath Babu and Ambika also play significant roles. This film marks Suriya's first main lead role in a film and Preetha's Tamil film debut. Deva composed the film's soundtrack while Rathnavelu handled the camera work. The film released on 9 July 1998.

== Plot ==
Vishwa and Nilani fall in love. Her mother does not approve, but she goes along with it. Complications arise when Vishwa exhibits "fashion" photos that he has taken of Nilani, which further upsets her mother. Then it comes to light that Surya's father Santhosh had an affair, and things take a dramatic, tragic turn for the lovers. In the end, both families arrive at the airport to prevent Nilani from boarding the flight, but to their bad luck, they could not stop it. Nilani commits suicide by swallowing poison from her ring, and Vishwa hits a wall and loses his sanity.

== Cast ==
- Suriya as Vishwa Santhosh
- Preetha Vijayakumar as Nilani
- Prakash Raj as Santhosh, Vishwa's father
- Ambika as Ambika, Nilani's mother
- Radhika as Vishwa's mother
- Sarath Babu as Nilani's father
- Manivannan
- Anandaraj as Inspector
- Vaiyapuri as Hospital Patient
- Rani
- Alphonsa
- Baby Jennifer as Vishwa's sister

== Production ==
The film was produced by Malaysia-based Tamil settlers Rajah and Vijayan. Rajah owned Rajah Video Centre in Sentul while his partner, Vijayan, was also a businessman from Sentul. The shoot of the film was carried out in places such as Delhi, Jaipur, Jodhpur, Rajasthan, Goa and Himachal Pradesh. The film was initially set to star Vishva, the brother of actresses Ambika and Radha, alongside Simran, but later went through a change of cast. Sivakumar was originally offered the role of Suriya's father; however due to his refusal he was replaced by Prakash Raj.

== Soundtrack ==
Music was composed by Deva.

Track listing
No.	Title	Lyrics	Singer(s)	Length
1.	"Davadikkathe"	Ponniyin Selvan	Deva, Murali	5:32
2.	"Gnabagam Irukriadha"	Vairamuthu	Hariharan, Anuradha Sriram	5:33
3.	"Naanthaan"	Palani Bharathi	Harini	5:01
4.	"Radha Radha"	Vairamuthu	S. P. Balasubrahmanyam, Sujatha	5:34
5.	"Andha Vennila"	Palani Bharathi	Annupamaa	5:27
6.	"Namma Meena"	Kalidasan	Krishnaraj, Swarnalatha	5:28
Total length:				31:59

== Release ==
Sandhippoma released on 9 July 1998.
