= Sangliyana =

- DVD cover
- Directed by: P. Nanjundappa
- Written by: K.V. Raju, P. Nanjundappa
- Screenplay by: K.V. Raju
- Story by: K.V. Raju
- Produced by: J. Rameshlal; S. V. Ganesh; M. R. Kashinath; P. Nanjundappa
- Starring: Shankar Nag; Bhavya; Tara; Ambareesh
- Cinematography: Mallikarjun
- Edited by: K. Balu
- Music by: Hamsalekha
- Production company: Pushpagiri Films
- Release date: 1988
- Running time: 134 minutes
- Country: India
- Language: Kannada

Sangliana is a 1988 Indian Kannada-language action drama film directed, co-produced and written by P. Nanjundappa. The film, loosely inspired by the life story of H. T. Sangliana, stars Shankar Nag, alongside Bhavya, Tara, Lohithaswa, Vajramuni, Devaraj, Sudheer, with actor Ambareesh making a special appearance. The music was composed by Hamsalekha, while cinematography and editing were handled by Mallikarjun and K. Balu. A. R. Rahman had worked as an assistant in the film.

A sequel of the film was made with the same cast and crew and was titled as S. P. Sangliyana Part 2 which released in 1990. After Shankar Nag's demise, a third installment titled Sangliyana Part-3 released in 1997 starring Devaraj (who was the antagonist of the first two parts) - thereby becoming the second character-based trilogy in Kannada after CID 999. Nag's portrayal of cop was noted by critics to have offered grit and realism in his role - albeit in the commercial space - which can be seen as a template to many follow-up films.

== Plot ==
Ram, a notorious thug, saves some people from getting killed by Vikram, the son of MLA Nagappa and his henchmen, who wants to construct a powerplant. Vikram gets impressed and appoints Ram as one of his henchmen. Ram meets Kanchana, the daughter of Mahesh, an investigating reporter. Mahesh is against Nagappa and Vikram's atrocities. Ram falls for Kanchana and pursues her to accept him, and Kanchana reciprocates his love despite reluctance. Ram meets Avinash, a young boy, and his mentally disabled mother Lakshmi. Lakshmi's husband is a forest officer, who discovers that Vikram is actually involved in smuggling Sandalwood and tries to arrest them, but is killed by Vikram and his henchmen which makes Lakshmi lose her mental balance after witnessing her husband's death.

The DGP, who gets fed up by the atrocities committed by Vikram and Nagappa, appoints Inspector Sangliyana to gather evidence against Vikram and Nagappa and arrest them. Vikram arrives at Mahesh's printing press to warn him and attempts to break Kanchana's hand, but is stopped by Ram, who thrashes Vikram. Enraged, Vikram places false charges against Ram and is brought to the station, where they learn that Ram is actually Sangliyana and the cop who took Sangliyana's place is Inspector Amar as they planned a covert operation against Vikram and Nagappa. Sangliyana takes charge and closes gambling dens and other operations. Kalle Gowda, the Nagpatna constituency tries to bribe Sangliyana, but Sangliyana arrest Kalle Gowda in charges of his wife's death.

Nagappa fakes Kalle Gowda's death to help him escape, but is thwarted by Sangliyana, who catches Kalle Gowda and takes him to prison. Lakshmi recovers and reunites with Avinash. Sangliyana arrests Vikram in a case and also requests Mahesh to participate in elections. Mahesh accepts and wins the election against Nagappa. Nagappa tries to kill Mahesh, with the help of his second son Kumbi, but is outsmarted by Sangliyana. Nagappa kidnaps Mahesh, Kanchana and Lakshmi. Sangliyana arrives, along with Amar and rescues them, but Lakshmi is killed in the process by Nagendra. Nagendra, Vikram and Kumbi are arrested, and Sangliyana is appreciated by the DGP and is transferred to another city. Sangliyana leaves with Kanchana and Avinash.

== Cast ==
- Shankar Nag as Ram/Inspector Sangliyana
- Ambareesh as Inspector Amar
- Srinath as DGP
- Bhavya as Kanchana, Mahesh's daughter
- Devaraj as Vikram "Vikki"
- Tara as Lakshmi, forest officer's wife
- Master Manjunath as Avinash
- Vajramuni as Nagappa, Vikki's father
- Doddanna as Kalle Gowda
- Lohithaswa as Mahesh, Kanchana's father
- Sudhir as Kumbi
- Gayatri Prabhakar as Kalle Gowda's wife
- Prathiba as a call girl
- Ramesh Kamath as a forest officer, Lakshmi's husband
- Roger Narayan as Kumar
- Disco Shanti as a pub dancer

== Soundtrack ==
Sangliyana
- Soundtrack cover

Soundtrack album by Hamsalekha
- Released: 22 December 1987
- Genre: Feature film soundtrack
- Length: 19:07
- Label: Lahiri Music

The music was composed by Hamsalekha, with lyrics written by V. Manohar and Doddarangegowda.

Track listing
No.	Title	Lyrics	Singer(s)	Length
1.	"Bandalo Bandalo Kanchana"	Hamsalekha	S. P. Balasubrahmanyam; Manjula Gururaj	4:32
2.	"Raja Nanna Raja"	V. Manohar	Shankar Nag; Manjula Gururaj	4:40
3.	"Doorada Oorininda"	Hamsalekha	S. P. Balasubrahmanyam; Manjula Gururaj	4:41
4.	"Preethiyinda"	Doddarangegowda	S. P. Balasubrahmanyam; Manjula Gururaj; B. R. Chaya	5:14
Total length:				19:07
