= Kempaiah =

Indian police officer

Commissioner of Police of Mysuru

2014-2018 Minister of State of Karnataka

Kempaiah is a police officer from Karnataka, India. He is famous for investigating the assassination of Rajiv Gandhi.

He led the Karnataka police team that tracked Sivarasan, prime suspect in the Rajiv Gandhi murder case, to his hideout in Konanakunte outside Bengaluru. However, Sivarasan killed himself before he could be captured. Kempaiah is one of the few living people from Karnataka who has had a movie made about his life. Kempaiah IPS features Shashi Kumar as the hero.

When Kempaiah was in charge of the Special Task Force (STF), he pursued sandalwood smuggler and forest brigand Veerappan.

Kempaiah was Police Commissioner of Mysuru, and in his retirement from the police was appointed in 2014 a Minister of State in the capacity of advisor to the Home Minister of Karnataka. Informally, in this role he has also acted as a close associate of Chief Minister Siddaramaiah (who was Chief Minister from 2013 to 2018, and is the incumbent since 2023).

In 2018, Kempaiah was asked by the Chief Election Officer of Karnataka, Sanjay Kumar, to resign, following MLA G.T. Devegowda's accusation that he was a “hindrance to holding free and fair Assembly polls”. Following this, his official role was decommissioned, though he continued in his informal capacity for the remainder of Siddaramaiah's first tenure.
