= Onde Guri =

- Directed by: H. R. Bhargava
- Screenplay by: H. R. Bhargava
- Dialogues by: Chi. Udayashankar
- Story by: M. P. Shankar
- Produced by: M. P. Shankar
- Starring: Vishnuvardhan; M. P. Shankar; Ramakrishna; Madhavi
- Cinematography: D. V. Rajaram; N. K. Sathish
- Edited by: Yadav Victor
- Music by: Rajan–Nagendra
- Production company: Bharani Chithra
- Distributed by: Bharani Chithra
- Release date: 9 March 1983
- Running time: 138 minutes
- Country: India
- Language: Kannada

Onde Guri is a 1983 Indian Kannada-language action film directed by H. R. Bhargava and produced by M. P. Shankar, who wrote the story, under Bharani Chithra. The film stars Vishnuvardhan, alongside Madhavi, M. P. Shankar, Ramakrishna, Tiger Prabhakar and Vajramuni. The music was composed by Rajan–Nagendra, while cinematography and editing were handled by Yadav Victor and D. V. Rajaram and N. K. Sathish. The film was inspired from 1979 film Mad Max and was dubbed in Tamil as Pani Puyal.

== Plot ==
Kumar, a CID officer, is assigned to stop a violent motorcycle gang from committing gruesome heists and killings. Kumar soon earns the wrath of the gang leader when he shoots his leg during a jewellery heist. The leader and his gang barge into Kumar's house and kill his brother Krishna and fiancèe Padmini. Kumar and Padmini's father Ganesh wants to avenge their deaths, but decides to lay low for the safety of their family and leaves for Mangalore. The gang soon learns about Kumar's location, they hunt down and kill Ganesh, Kumar's mother and his infant child, but Kumar's wife Rohini survives the incident. Enraged, Kumar finally hunts down the gang and its leader during the robberies and kills them, thus avenging his families' death.

== Cast ==
- Vishnuvardhan as Kumar
- Madhavi as Rohini
- Sowcar Janaki as Kumar's mother
- M. P. Shankar as Ganesh
- Ramakrishna as Krishna
- Sadhana as Padmini
- Tiger Prabhakar as the leader of the motorcycle gang
- Vajramuni as the motorcycle gang member
- Sudheer as the motorcycle gang member
- Sundar Krishna Urs as DIG Somasekhar, Rohini's father
- Shakti Prasad
- Negro Johnny
- Musuri Krishnamurthy
- Dinesh
- Uma Shivakumar
- Jayamalini

== Production ==
After scripting and directing Rama Lakshmana, M. P. Shankar decided to make an action-oriented film, where he wrote the story after gaining inspiration from 1979 film Mad Max. H. R. Bhargava chose to work on the script and Chi. Udayashankar wrote the lyrics and dialogues. Vishnuvardhan, who was popular among the youth as an Angry Young Man through his role in Sahasa Simha, was selected to play the protagonist. Madhavi, who gained popularity in Kannada film industry through Haalu Jenu, was signed as the heroine. Prabhakar was selected to play the main antagonist, while Vajramuni was given a supporting role. M. P. Shankar had a pivotal role in the film and decided to produce and distribute the film under his production banner Bharani Chitra.

== Soundtrack ==
Onde Guri

Soundtrack album by Rajan–Nagendra
- Released: 1981
- Genre: Feature film soundtrack

The soundtrack and background score were composed by Rajan–Nagendra.

Track #	Song	Singer(s)
1	"Ee Bhavageete"	S. P. Balasubrahmanyam
2	"Nannanegoo Naa Ninnanu"	S. P. Balasubrahmanyam, S. Janaki
3	"Ranga Baaro"	S. Janaki
4	"Anda Nodi"	S. P. Sailaja, S. P. Balasubrahmanyam

== Release ==
Onde Guri was released on 9 March 1983 and was later re-released with 5.1 DTS sound in 2022 after the re-release of Sahasa Simha.
