= Dheerga Sumangali =

1974 Tamil-language drama film

- Theatrical release poster
- Directed by: A. C. Tirulokchandar
- Screenplay by: A. C. Tirulokchandar
- Story by: G. Balasubramaniam
- Produced by: N. S. Rajendran
- Starring: K. R. Vijaya; Muthuraman
- Cinematography: M. Viswanatha Rai
- Edited by: B. Kanthasamy
- Music by: M. S. Viswanathan
- Production company: Visalakshi Combines
- Release date: 12 April 1974
- Running time: 162 minutes
- Country: India
- Language: Tamil

Dheerga Sumangali (transl. Eternally Married Woman) is a 1974 Indian Tamil-language drama film co-written and directed by A. C. Tirulokchandar. The film was produced by N. S. Rajendran under Visalakshi Combines and stars K. R. Vijaya and Muthuraman, while Major Sundarrajan, V. K. Ramasamy and Sivakumar play supporting roles. The film's soundtrack and background score were composed by M. S. Viswanathan, while the lyrics for the songs were written by Kannadasan and Vaali.

M. Viswanatha Rai and B. Kandasamy handled cinematography and editing respectively. The film's story was written by G. Balasubramaniam and the dialogues were written by Karaikudi Narayanan. The film was released on 12 April 1974. It was remade in Telugu with the same name (1974), in Kannada as Bhagyavantharu (1977), in Malayalam as Aayiram Janmangal (1976) and in Hindi as Sadaa Suhagan (1986).

== Plot ==
Lakshmi and Sundaram are a happily married couple with two sons and a daughter. Sundaram, a disciplinarian, enforces strict rules in his household, leading to conflict with his sons who crave freedom. Unable to tolerate their father's control, both sons leave home, causing immense pain and worry for Lakshmi.

Despite the turmoil, Lakshmi remains steadfast in her devotion to Sundaram and her family. She dedicates herself to upholding their traditions and values, even as she grapples with the emotional strain of her sons' absence. As time passes, Lakshmi's unwavering commitment and sacrifices gradually soften Sundaram's strict nature, leading him to introspect and change his ways.

Meanwhile, the sons navigate the world outside their sheltered upbringing, encountering hardships and challenges that ultimately lead them to appreciate the values instilled in them by their parents. This realization prompts them to return home, seeking reconciliation and forgiveness.

The film culminates in a heartwarming reunion as the family reconciles their differences and rekindles their love and bond. Through Lakshmi's perseverance and Sundaram's transformation, Dheerga Sumangali emphasizes the importance of family, tradition, and understanding in overcoming challenges and maintaining a strong, loving relationship.

== Cast ==
- K. R. Vijaya as Lakshmi
- Muthuraman as Sundaram
- Major Sundarrajan
- V. K. Ramasamy as Lakshmi's father
- C. K. Saraswathi as Lakshmi's stepmother
- Sivakumar as Babu
- Junior Balaiah as Kumar
- Jayachitra as Shobha
- S. N. Lakshmi as Annammal
- Suruli Rajan as the cook
- Mahendran as Sikhamani
- Pushpalatha
- Jayasudha as Babu's wife
- Babloo Prithiveeraj

== Production ==
The dialogues of Dheerga Sumangali were written by Karaikudi Narayanan. S. N. Lakshmi who acted in the film recalled that during the climax scene, Tirulokchandar suggested her to cry without glycerine and she had enacted as per his instructions. Sivakumar and Vijaya who earlier acted as lead pair enacted the roles of son and mother in this film. The song "Aayiram Aayiram" and some scenes were shot at Ooty. Sivakumar worked as makeup artist applying makeup for Vijaya for a scene.

== Soundtrack ==
The soundtrack was composed by M. S. Viswanathan. The song "Malligai En Mannan" was well received and gave breakthrough for its playback singer Vani Jairam. Vani recalled that it was a challenging song and "he (Viswanathan) trusted me with it". When Vani was in Madras (now Chennai) for two music concerts at a Bhajan Sammelan, Viswanathan, who was the chief guest, was impressed by her performance and gave her the opportunity to sing the song.

Songs	Singers	Lyrics
"Aayiram Aayiram"	S. P. Balasubrahmanyam, P. Susheela	Kannadasan
"Malligai En Mannan"	Vani Jairam	Vaali
"Welcome"	L. R. Eswari	Kannadasan
"Deerga"	P. Susheela	Vaali

== Release and reception ==
Dheerga Sumangali was released on 12 April 1974. Kanthan of Kalki praised Tirulokchander's direction and writing. Navamani praised the acting, music and direction. Vijaya won the Filmfare Special Commendation Award for Performance.

== Remakes ==
The film was remade in was remade in Telugu with the same name (1974), in Kannada as Bhagyavantharu (1977), in Malayalam as Aayiram Janmangal (1976) and in Hindi as Sadaa Suhagan (1986).
