= Shamlee =

Indian actress (born 1987)

- Born: Shamlee; 10 July 1987 (age 39); Chennai, Tamil Nadu, India
- Other name: Baby Shamlee
- Occupation: Actress
- Years active: 1989—2000 (child artist), 2009, 2016-2018 (Actress)
- Relatives: Shalini (sister); Richard Rishi (brother); Ajith Kumar (brother-in-law)
- Awards: National Film Award for Best Child Artist; Kerala State Film Award for Best Child Artist; Tamil Nadu State Film Award for Best Child Artist; Karnataka State Film Award for Best Child Artist

Shamlee (born 10 July 1987) is an Indian former actress who has worked in Telugu, Tamil, Kannada, and Malayalam films. Her roles include the mentally challenged child Anjali in the 1990 Tamil-language film Anjali, for which she won the National Film Award for Best Child Artist, and a child trapped inside a bore-well in the Malayalam-language film Malootty, which won her a Kerala State Film Award for Best Child Artist. She has also won the Karnataka State Film Award for Best Female Child Actor for her performance in her Kannada debut Mathe Haaditu Kogile.

== Early life ==
Shamlee is from a family of actors, being the younger sister to actor Richard Rishi and actress Shalini. She was born to Babu and Alice. Her father migrated to Madras with an ambition of becoming an actor and the family settled there.

== Career ==
Shamlee started acting at the age of two in Tamil Cinema with the Vijaykanth starrer Rajanadai. In 1990, she acted in Bharathan's Malootty, a film based on Jessica McClure. Her performance won her critical appreciation and the Kerala State Film Award for Best Child Artist. Her breakthrough came with Mani Ratnam's Anjali, in which she portrayed a mentally challenged child, which earned her widespread critical acclaim across South India and the National Film Award for Best Child Artist. At that time, Shamlee was regarded as one of the youngest income tax assessees ever. After Anjali, Shamlee became inarguably the most sought out child artist in South Indian cinema and, thus in subsequent years, acted in many roles in all four South Indian languages.

In 2009, she played her first female lead role in Anand Ranga's directorial debut Oy! (2009) alongside Siddarth with her performance receiving a mixed response. Between 2010 and 2015, Shamili studied and worked in Singapore and later returned to Chennai to work on the production of Veera Shivaji alongside Vikram Prabhu in 2016, which was panned by critics. Her performance also received negative reviews with indiaglitz claiming “Shamlee gets a forgettable debut as a heroine in Tamil. Her lip sync is poor and the scenes involving her do no help her either”. and sify also stating she is “as stiff as a wax statue with barely any emotion”. Shamili also acted in the Malayalam film Valleem Thetti Pulleem Thetti the same year, which was also panned and received negative reviews.

== Filmography ==
=== As child artist ===
Year	Movie	Role	Language	Notes
1989	Rajanadai	Shamili "Shamu"	Tamil	
1990	Magadu	Baby	Telugu	Tamil dubbed as Meesaikaran
1990	Anjali	Anjali	Tamil	Won - National Film Award for Best Child Artist; Tamil Nadu State Film Award for Best Child Artist
1990	Malootty	Malootty	Malayalam	Won - Kerala State Film Award for Best Child Artist
1990	Jagadeka Veerudu Athiloka Sundari	Bujji	Telugu	
1990	Mathe Haaditu Kogile	Pallavi	Kannada	Won - Karnataka State Film Award for Best Child Artist
1990	Durga	Durga, Mallika	Tamil	
1991	Thai Poosam	Velayutham	Tamil	
1991	Sendhoora Devi	Sindhu, Nandu	Tamil	
1991	Pookkalam Varavayi	Geethu	Malayalam	
1991	Anbu Sangili	Geethu	Tamil	
1991	Keechu Raallu	Jyoti	Telugu	
1991	Bhairavi		Kannada	
1991	Kilukkampetti	Chikkumol	Malayalam	
1991	Shwetaagni		Kannada	
1991	Vaasalile Oru Vennila	Ammu	Tamil	
1992	Police Lockup		Kannada	
1992	Killer	Sneha	Telugu	
1992	Sivasankari		Tamil	
1992	Devar Veettu Ponnu	Sangari, Savithri	Tamil	
1992	Naga Bala		Telugu	
1992	Nani		Telugu	
1992	Parvathalu Panakalu	Mahalakshmi	Telugu	
1992	Sukravaram Mahalakshmi		Telugu	
1993	Joker	Apple	Telugu	
1993	Kadambari		Kannada	
1993	Chinna Kannamma	Saranya	Tamil	
1993	Sambhavi		Kannada	
1993	Nippu Ravva	Engineer's daughter	Telugu	Hindi dubbed as Mawali Raj
1993	Thanga Pappa	Abhirami	Tamil	Won - Cinema Express Award for Best Child Artist
1993	Dakshayini		Kannada	
1993	Hoovu Hannu	Triveni	Kannada	
1993	Sivarathiri		Tamil	
1994	Makkala Sakshi		Kannada	
1994	Chinna Nee Naguthiru		Kannada	
1994	Bhuvaneshwari		Kannada	
1994	Anga Rakshakudu		Telugu	
1994	Doragariki Donga Pellam	Baby Vani	Telugu	
1995	Nirnayam	Parukkutty	Malayalam	
1995	Karulina Kudi		Kannada	
1996	Lalanam	Ammu	Malayalam	
1998	Harikrishnans	Ammalu	Malayalam	
1998	Jagadeeshwari	Jagadeeshwari	Kannada	
1998	Thayin Manikodi	Rosie	Tamil	
2000	Kandukondain Kandukondain	Kamala	Tamil	

=== As lead actress ===
Year	Film	Role	Language	Notes	Ref.
2009	Oy!	Sandhya Jagarlamudi	Telugu		
2016	Valleem Thetti Pulleem Thetti	Sreedevi	Malayalam		
2016	Veera Sivaji	Anjali	Tamil		
2018	Ammammagarillu	Sita	Telugu		

Awards
National Film Award
Preceded by Mrin Moyee Chandrakar for Kalat Nakalat	Best Child Artist for Anjali (shared with Tarun and Shruthi); 1990	Succeeded by Santhosh Reddy for Bhadram Koduko
