= Mathe Haaditu Kogile =

Matthe Haadithu Kogile
- VCD cover
- Directed by: H. R. Bhargava
- Written by: Chi. Udaya Shankar
- Screenplay by: H. R. Bhargava
- Story by: Chi. Udaya Shankar
- Produced by: S. Shankar
- Starring: Vishnuvardhan; Anant Nag; Bhavya; Rupini
- Cinematography: D. V. Rajaram
- Edited by: B. Nagesh
- Music by: Rajan–Nagendra
- Production company: Sri Shankari Productions
- Distributed by: Sri Shankari Productions
- Release date: 20 September 1990
- Running time: 146 min
- Country: India
- Language: Kannada

Matthe Haadithu Kogile (Kannada: ಮತ್ತೆ ಹಾಡಿತು ಕೋಗಿಲೆ) is a 1990 Indian Kannada film, directed by H. R. Bhargava and produced by S. Shankar. The film stars Vishnuvardhan, Baby Shyamili, Anant Nag, Bhavya and Rupini. The film has musical score by Rajan–Nagendra. The film was a romantic drama. Vishnuvardhan and Anant Nag co-starred together for the first time. They would follow it up a few years later with Nishkarsha.

Director Bhargava revealed that he was so enchanted with Naa Ninna Mareyalare on which he worked as an associate that he requested Chi. Udayashankar for a similar themed story - a tragic love story between hero and heroine where the hero named Anand has a constant companion in the form of bike. Udayashankar worked on a story idea that Rajkumar had not accepted since he had done a similar role - a hero taking care of an abandoned child - in Devara Makkalu.

== Plot ==
Anand (Vishnuvardhan) is a stage singer. He lives with his best friend Gopal (Ramesh Bhat). Kavitha (Bhavya) is a close friend of Anand and is secretly in love with him. Sangeetha (Rupini) the daughter of a rich businessman Vishwaprasad (Ashok Rao) and Anand fall in love. Vishwaprasad does not approve of Anand and arranges Sangeetha's marriage with Prasanna (Anant Nag). Vishwaprasad manages to engage Anand for a concert in Chennai when the marriage is to take place. On finding this out, Anand rushes to stop the marriage but is attacked by Vishwaprasad's goons. In a tough fight he gets hit on the head, loses consciousness and is admitted to the hospital.

Sangeetha tries to commit suicide by taking poison on the first night of her marriage. Prasanna admits her to the hospital. Anand visits Sangeetha and makes her promise to accept Prasanna as her husband. Sangeetha dies while delivering a baby girl. Prasanna faces problems as a single parent. His brother suggests that he remarry. Prasanna decides to marry a girl from a poor family.

Savitha, Kavitha's younger sister, marries him for his wealth and status but dislikes the child. Prasanna considers giving away his child for adoption. Kavitha reveals the details of Sangeetha and Anand's friendship. Prasanna gives the child away to Anand. Anand names her Pallavi and raises her like his own daughter. Savitha has an abortion and loses her child-bearing potential.

Pallavi (Shamlee) and Anand are living as a happy family. Kavitha is unmarried and helps Anand take care of Pallavi. Prasanna and Savitha attend Anand and Pallavi's concert. Savitha now wants Pallavi back. Anand gives Pallavi back to Prasanna with a heavy heart. Pallavi is unable to accept them as her parents. One day when Prasanna holds a cocktail party Pallavi unknowingly drinks alcohol and becomes unconscious. Prasanna admits her to the hospital. Anand sings a sad song, "Matte Haditu Kole," to wake her up. Pallavi recovers. Prasanna decides not to interfere in Pallavi's life.

== Cast ==
- Vishnuvardhan as Anand
- Anant Nag as Prasan Kumar
- Bhavya as Kavitha
- Rupini as Sangeetha
- Baby Shamili as Pallavi
- Sathyashree as Savitha
- Mukhyamantri Chandru as Pradeep
- Ramesh Bhat as Gopal
- Ashok Rao as Vishwaprasad
- Doddanna as Santhosh

== Soundtrack ==
All the songs composed by Rajan–Nagendra, written by Chi. Udayashankar.

Track-List
No.	Title	Singer(s)	Length
1.	"Baa Nanna Sangeetha"	S. P. Balasubrahmanyam, Chandrika Gururaj	4:05
2.	"Haaduva Aase"	SPB, K. S. Chitra	4:58
3.	"Naanindu Ninninda"	SPB, K. S. Chitra	4:37
4.	"Nava Vasanthada"	SPB, K. S. Chitra	4:12
5.	"Nimmannu Kandaagale"	SPB	4:38
6.	"Thananana Haaduve"	SPB, S. Janaki	5:16
