= Bhagyavantharu =

- VCD cover
- Directed by: H. R. Bhargava
- Written by: Chi. Udaya Shankar
- Screenplay by: H. R. Bhargava
- Based on: Dheerga Sumangali (1974)
- Produced by: Dwarakish
- Starring: Rajkumar; B. Saroja Devi
- Cinematography: D. V. Jayaram
- Edited by: Bal G. Yadav
- Music by: Rajan–Nagendra
- Production company: Dwarakish Chitra
- Release date: 16 March 1977
- Running time: 159 minutes
- Country: India
- Language: Kannada

Bhagyavantharu is a 1977 Indian Kannada-language drama film directed by H. R. Bhargava, making his debut. The film features Rajkumar and B. Saroja Devi in lead roles supported by an ensemble cast including Ashok, Balakrishna, Dwarakish and Ramakrishna. The film was produced by Dwarakish. The dialogues and lyrics were written by Chi. Udaya Shankar. The film's original score and soundtrack were composed by Rajan–Nagendra. Puneeth Rajkumar made a brief appearance in one of the songs of this film. The movie is a remake of 1974 Tamil movie Dheerga Sumangali.

== Plot ==
Parvathi and Kumar are a happily married couple with two sons and a daughter who share a deep, loving bond. However, Kumar's strict, disciplinarian nature creates friction with his sons, who eventually leave home in search of freedom, leaving Parvathi heartbroken.

Amid the family turmoil, Parvathi is diagnosed with terminal blood cancer, though Kumar asks the doctor to keep the truth from her. Kumar himself is diagnosed with severe hypertension and hides his own condition as well.

As Parvathi struggles with the pain of separation, Kumar begins to reflect on his rigid ways and undergoes a profound change. Meanwhile, his sons face life's hardships, come to appreciate the values their parents instilled in them, and return home seeking forgiveness after Kumar informs them of Parvathi's failing health. The family reconciles and celebrates Kumar and Parvathi's 25th wedding anniversary.

Soon after, Parvathi's condition deteriorates rapidly. As Kumar frantically tries to summon the doctor, she reveals that she had long known about her terminal illness after overhearing his conversation with the doctor but chose to keep it a secret to spare him further pain. Asking him to stay by her side in her final moments, she dies in his arms. Having neglected his hypertension medication, Kumar suffers a fatal heart attack and dies embracing Parvathi, symbolizing their eternal love and fulfilling their vow to remain together in life and death.

== Cast ==
- Dr. Rajkumar as Kumar
- B. Saroja Devi as Parvathi, Kumar's wife
- Ashok as Ramu, Kumar's eldest son
- Balakrishna as Mahadevayya, Parvathi's Father
- Thoogudeepa Srinivas as Lawyer Gundu Rao
- Mynavathi as Pankaja, Gundu Rao's wife
- Ramakrishna as Arun, Gundu Rao's son
- M. S. Umesh
- Sampath as Doctor
- M. S. Sathyu
- M. N. Lakshmi Devi as Parvathi's step mother
- Shashikala as Kumar's sister
- B. Jaya as Parvathamma
- Dwarakish as Subbu, Parvathi's step brother (Guest appearance)
- Gurudath Musuri as young Ramu
- Puneeth Rajkumar in a cameo

== Soundtrack ==
Bhagyavantharu

Soundtrack album by Rajan–Nagendra
- Released: 1977
- Genre: Feature film soundtrack
- Label: Saregama

The music was composed by Rajan–Nagendra, with lyrics by Chi. Udaya Shankar.

Track listing
No.	Title	Singer(s)	Length
1.	"Bhagyavantharu Naave"	P. B. Sreenivas, S. Janaki, S. P. Balasubrahmanyam, Indumathi	5:49
2.	"Ninna Nanna Manavu"	Rajkumar
3.	"Ninna Snehake"	Rajkumar, P. Susheela

== Re-release ==
In 2020, the film's negatives were brought to Prasad Labs in Chennai, where most of the restoration was completed within 20 days. The restored film was subsequently re-released in 2021 with 7.1-channel sound amidst great fan-fare.
