= Vasantha Poornima =

- Directed by: H. R. Bhargava
- Written by: Chi. Udaya Shankar
- Screenplay by: Chi. Udaya Shankar
- Story by: Dinesh Babu; Chi. Udaya Shankar
- Produced by: S. A. Srinivas
- Starring: Ambareesh; Priyanka; Balaraj; Anand
- Cinematography: D. V. Rajaram
- Edited by: Manohar
- Music by: Shankar–Ganesh
- Production company: Sri Chowdeshwari Art Combines
- Distributed by: Sri Chowdeshwari Art Combines
- Release date: 6 April 1993
- Running time: 123 min
- Country: India
- Language: Kannada

Vasantha Poornima is a 1993 Indian Kannada-language film, directed by H. R. Bhargava and produced by S. A. Srinivas. The film stars Ambareesh, Priyanka, Balaraj and Anand. The film has musical score by Shankar–Ganesh.

== Cast ==
- Ambareesh
- Priyanka
- Balaraj
- Anand
- K. S. Ashwath
- Ramesh Bhat
- Shani Mahadevappa
- Naveen
- Nadig
- Master Vijayaraghavendra
- Sushma
- Pandari Bai
- Shobha Raghavendra
- Sriraksha
- Srimathi Rao
- Rama Aravind
- Honnavalli Krishna
- Devaraj

== Soundtrack ==
The music was composed by Shankar–Ganesh.

No.	Song	Singers	Lyrics	Length (m:ss)
1	"Hathira Hathira Barale"	S. P. Balasubrahmanyam, Manjula Gururaj	Chi. Udaya Shankar	
2	"Lajje Yeke"	S. P. Balasubrahmanyam	Chi. Udaya Shankar	
3	"Manasu Manasu"	S. P. Balasubrahmanyam, Manjula Gururaj	Chi. Udaya Shankar	
4	"Oho Darling"	S. P. Balasubrahmanyam, Manjula Gururaj	Chi. Udaya Shankar	
5	"Samagama Sarigama"	S. P. Balasubrahmanyam	Chi. Udaya Shankar	
