= Aayiram Janmangal =

- Directed by: P. N. Sundaram
- Written by: G. Balasubramaniam; Thoppil Bhasi (dialogues)
- Screenplay by: Thoppil Bhasi
- Based on: Dheerga Sumangali (Tamil)
- Produced by: Pavamani
- Starring: Prem Nazir; K. R. Vijaya; Sukumari; T. R. Omana
- Cinematography: S. S. Maniyan
- Edited by: G. Venkittaraman
- Music by: M. S. Viswanathan
- Production company: Prathap Chithra
- Distributed by: Prathap Chithra
- Release date: 27 August 1976
- Country: India
- Language: Malayalam

Aayiram Janmangal is a 1976 Indian Malayalam film, directed by P. N. Sundaram and produced by Pavamani. The film stars Prem Nazir, K. R. Vijaya, Sukumari and T. R. Omana in the lead roles. The film has musical score by M. S. Viswanathan. It is a remake of the 1974 Tamil film Dheerga Sumangali.

== Cast ==
- Prem Nazir as Madhavan Nair
- K. R. Vijaya as Lakshmi
- K. P. Ummer as Lawyer Sukumaran
- Sukumari as Leela Sukumaran
- T. R. Omana as Madhavan Nair's Aunty
- Sudheer as Babu
- Bahadoor as Krishnan
- Junior Balayya as Kumar
- Lakshmisree as Shobha
- Veeran as Lakshmi's Father
- Meena as Lakshmi's Stepmother
- Sripriya as Mallika
- Kunchan as Mohandas
- Master Raghu as Rajan's Childhood
- Master Sekhar as Rajan
- Master Sunil as Babu's Childhood
- Baby Babitha as Shobha's Childhood
- Master Anil as Kumar's Childhood

== Soundtrack ==
The music was composed by M. S. Viswanathan.

No.	Song	Singers	Lyrics	Length (m:ss)
1	"Achan Naaleyorappooppan"	K. J. Yesudas, P. Susheela, Ambili, Selma George	P. Bhaskaran	
2	"Dance Festival"	P. Jayachandran, L. R. Eswari	P. Bhaskaran	
3	"Mullamaala Choodivanna"	Vani Jayaram	P. Bhaskaran	
4	"Uthama Mahila Manikyam" (Aayiram Janmangal)	S. Janaki, Raveendran, M. S. Viswanathan, Shakeela Balakrishnan, Saibaba	P. Bhaskaran	
5	"Vilikkunnu Vilikkunnu"	P. Jayachandran, Shakeela Balakrishnan	P. Bhaskaran	
