= Sattekalapu Satteyya =

1969 film directed by K. Balachander

- Theatrical release poster
- Directed by: K. Balachander
- Written by: K. Balachander
- Produced by: V. K. Prasad
- Starring: Chalam; Sobhan Babu; Rajasree
- Cinematography: N. Balakrishna
- Edited by: N. R. Kittu
- Music by: M. S. Viswanathan
- Production company: Prasad Arts
- Release date: 19 June 1969
- Country: India
- Language: Telugu

Sattekalapu Satteyya (transl. Truthful Satteyya) is a 1969 Indian Telugu-language film written and directed by K. Balachander, starring Chalam, Sobhan Babu and Rajasree. It was released on 19 June 1969. The film was later remade in Tamil as Patham Pasali (1970) by Balachander himself, in Hindi as Mastana (1970) and in Kannada as Manku Thimma (1980).

== Cast ==
- Chalam
- Sobhan Babu
- Rajasree
- Roja Ramani
- Gummadi
- S. Varalakshmi
- Satyanarayana
- Vijaya Lalitha

== Soundtrack ==
The soundtrack was composed by M. S. Viswanathan, while the lyrics were written by Acharya Aatreya, Aarudra, Sri Sri, Rajasri and Kosaraju.

1. Alaga Chudu Ilaga Chudu, lyrics: Sri.Sri, singer: Pitapuram Nageswararao
2. E Inti Pantavu Muddu Muddu Navvu, lyrics: Aatreya, singer: P.B. Srinivas
3. Nannu Evaro Thakuri Kannu Evaro, lyrics: Arudra, singer: Ghantasala, P. Susheela
4. Prajalantha Kolicheti Bhagavanthudu, lyrics: Rajasri, singer: S.P. Balu, B. Vasantha
5. Muddu Muddu Navvu Buggalo Ruvvu, lyrics: Aatreya, singer: P.B. Srinivas
6. Padaharella Vayase Vayasu, lyrics: Arudra, singer: P. Susheela

== Release and reception ==
Sattekalapu Satteyya was released on 19 June 1969. Following Balachander's death in 2014, Deccan Chronicle named Sattekalapu Satteyya as one of his "memorable" films.
