= Thoondil Meen =

- Theatrical release poster
- Directed by: Ra. Sankaran
- Screenplay by: Karaikudi Narayanan
- Story by: Javar Seetharaman
- Starring: Lakshmi; Mohan Sharma; Major Sundarrajan
- Cinematography: K. S. Bhaskar Rao
- Edited by: Mani; Umanath
- Music by: V. Kumar
- Release date: 1 April 1977
- Country: India
- Language: Tamil

Thoondil Meen (transl. Fish in the hook) is a 1977 Indian Tamil-language thriller film directed by Ra. Sankaran. The film stars Lakshmi, Mohan Sharma and Major Sundarrajan. It was released on 1 April 1977. The film was remade in Hindi as Trishna (1978), in Kannada as Avala Hejje (1981) and in Telugu as Bandhalu Anubandhalu (1982).

== Cast ==
- Lakshmi as Seetha
- Mohan Sharma as Thyagarajan
- Major Sundarrajan as Rangan

== Production ==
Thoondil Meen was directed by Ra. Sankaran based on a story by Javar Seetharaman. The screenplay and dialogues for the film were written by Karaikudi Narayanan.

== Soundtrack ==
Soundtrack was composed by V. Kumar and lyrics by Vaali.

Track listing
No.	Title	Singer(s)	Length
1.	"Vaazhvil"	S. P. Balasubrahmanyam, P. Susheela
2.	"Ennidam"	P. Jayachandran, Swarna

== Release and reception ==
Thoondil Meen was released on 1 April 1977. Kanthan of Kalki praised the performances of Lakshmi and Sundarrajan but felt Mohan Sharma's performance as lifeless. The critic also added the film felt too slow after the interval and duets could have been removed to avoid lagging but praised Sankaran's direction and concluded whether or not the fish (meen) got caught by the hook (thoondil), a good story got trapped in Thoondil Meen.

== Remakes ==
The film was remade in Hindi as Trishna (1978), in Kannada as Avala Hejje (1981) and in Telugu as Bandhalu Anubandhalu (1982).
