= P. H. Vishwanath =

Indian Kannada film director, writer and producer

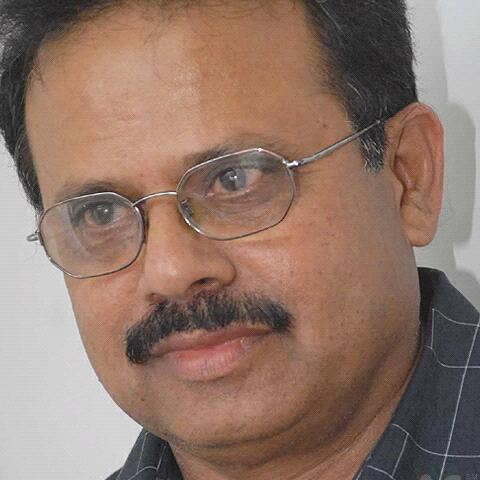
- Born: Vishwanath Parvathamallappa; Chitradurga District, Karnataka, India
- Occupations: Film director, producer and writer
- Years active: 1976-present

P. H. Vishwanath (Kannada: ಪಿ. ಎಚ್. ವಿಶ್ವನಾಥ್) is an Indian film director, writer and a producer who works in Kannada cinema. Apart from films, Vishwanath has directed several documentaries and tele-series. He started his film career as an assistant director to Puttanna Kanagal with College Ranga (1976) being his first release. Following this, he assisted for many films directed by Kanagal, Joe Simon, Hunsur Krishnamurthy and T. S. Nagabharana.

== Career ==
Vishwanath's second film as an independent director was the film Panchama Veda in 1990. Starring Ramesh Aravind and Sudharani, the film was both critical and commercial success, winning several awards. He continued to direct many successful films such as Ati Madhura Anuraga starring Kashinath, Nagendra Sha and Panchami, Munjaneya Manju starring Ambareesh, Sudharani and Tara, Musuku (1994), Srigandha (1995), Aragini (1995), Rangoli (1996), Andaman (1998) and Arunodaya (1999) throughout the 1990s. He pursued his interest in making documentaries in various field such as Agriculture, Sericulture, Environment- Passive Smoking, Ozone Layer Depletion, Rain Water Harvesting. There was a documentary that was released in Hanoi- Vietnam based on Rabies called Rabies is a Fatal But Preventable Disease for Rabies in Asia Foundation in 2009. You Only Live Once – Don't Die of Rabies is a public awareness film that was screened at Riacon in Colombo, Sri Lanka in late 2011. One Health One Goal – Elimination of Rabies was screened at Riacon in Bangkok, Thailand in late 2013. He has directed 73 documentaries as a whole.

In 2004, he headed the A nine-member jury committee, made the selections 2003–04 Karnataka State Film Awards.

He directed a children's film Kinnara Baale that won the best children film and best child artiste award from the Karnataka State Government (2010) and was screened at 7th International children's film festival 2012- Bangalore and Kolkata International Children film festival.

He directed a Tulu comedy film, Telikeda Bolli, which was critically acclaimed and won accolades. In 2016, he returned to mainstream cinema by directing a parallel film, Suli.

For his contribution in Kannada cinema, Vishwanath has been awarded with the Puttanna Kanagal Award by the Government of Karnataka for the year 2013. In 2014, he was elected as the President of the Karnataka Film Directors Association.

== Filmography ==
Year	Film title	Notes
1989	Madhu Masa	
1990	Panchama Veda	
1992	Athimadhura Anuraga	
1993	Munjaneya Manju	
1994	Musuku	
1995	Srigandha	
1995	Aragini	Karnataka State Film Award: Second Best Film
1996	Rangoli	
1998	Andaman	
1999	Arunodaya	
2005	Olave	Also producer
2009	Kinnara Baale	
2012	Telikeda Bolli	Tulu film
2016	Suli	
2023	Aade Nam God	
