= Patham Pasali =

- Directed by: K. Balachander
- Written by: K. Balachander
- Produced by: Alangudi Somu
- Starring: Gemini Ganesan; Nagesh; Rajasree
- Cinematography: Nemai Ghosh
- Edited by: N. R. Kittu
- Music by: V. Kumar
- Production company: Alangudi Movies
- Release date: 11 April 1970
- Country: India
- Language: Tamil

Patham Pasali (transl. Simpleton) is a 1970 Indian Tamil-language comedy drama film written and directed by K. Balachander. It is a remake of his own 1969 Telugu film Sattekalapu Satteya. The film stars Gemini Ganesan, Nagesh and Rajasree. It was released on 11 April 1970.

== Cast ==
Male cast

- Gemini Ganesan
- Nagesh
- S. A. Ashokan

Female cast

- Rajasree
- Manimala
- Vijaya Lalitha
- Sachu
- Baby Raji
- Jayakumari
- C. Vasantha

== Production ==
Patham Pasali was directed by K. Balachander, and a remake of his own Telugu film Sattekalapu Satteya (1969). It was produced by Alangudi Somu under Alangudi Movies. Cinematography was handled by Nemai Ghosh and editing by N. R. Kittu.

== Soundtrack ==
The soundtrack was composed by V. Kumar, while the lyrics were written by Alangudi Somu.

All lyrics are written by Alangudi Somu.

Track listing
No.	Title	Singer(s)	Length
1.	"Ammadi Embuttu"	T. M. Soundararajan
2.	"Vellai Manam Konda"	T. M. Soundarrajan, Swarna
3.	"Patham Pasali"	L. R. Eswari
4.	"Poda Pazhagattum"	T. M. Soundararajan
5.	"Amma Endroru"	P. Susheela

== Release and reception ==
Patham Pasali was released on 11 April 1970, and failed commercially. Thuglak gave the film a mixed review, to which Balachander published a reply, "I plead guilty".
