= Police Story =

Police Story may refer to:

== Films ==
- Police Story (film series), Hong Kong action films starring Jackie Chan
  - Police Story (1985 film)
  - Police Story 2, 1988
  - Police Story 3: Super Cop, 1992
  - Police Story 4: First Strike, 1996
  - New Police Story, 2004
  - Police Story 2013
- Flic Story, a 1975 French crime thriller
- Police Story (1979 film), a South Korean drama directed by Lee Doo-yong
- Police Story (1996 film), an Indian Kannada-language action film directed by Thriller Manju
  - Police Story 2 (2007 film)
  - Police Story 3 (2011 film)

== TV ==
- Police Story (1952 TV series), an American anthology series
- Police Story, an unsold TV series developed in 1967 by Gene Roddenberry
- Police Story (1973 TV series), including several TV movies, produced through 1987

== Other uses ==
- "Police Story", a single by Black Flag

== See also ==
- Once a Cop, a 1993 spin-off film of Police Story 3: Super Cop
- Police Stories, a video game
- Police Academy (disambiguation)
