= Action No. 1 =

- DVD cover
- Directed by: Sagar
- Dialogue by: Sai Nath
- Screenplay by: Sagar
- Produced by: Jananan Subba Rao
- Starring: Thriller Manju; Vani Viswanath; Ram Lakshman
- Production company: Star Films
- Release date: 15 February 2002
- Country: India
- Language: Telugu

Action No. 1 is a 2002 Indian Telugu-language action film directed by Sagar starring Thriller Manju, who composed the film's stunts, Vani Viswanath and the duo Ram Lakshman.

The film features no songs and was released to mixed reviews but the action sequences were praised. The film had an average box office run.

== Cast ==
- Thriller Manju as Teja
- Vani Viswanath as Kiran
- Ram as Vikram IPS
- Lakshman as Dharma
- Satya Prakash
- Meghna Naidu
- Srinivas
- Rallapalli
- Devadas Kanakala
- Prudhvi Raj
- Jeeva in a guest appearance
- Raghu Babu in a guest appearance

== Reception ==
Jeevi of Idlebrain.com rated the film three out of five and wrote that "This film is narrated in an interesting style, except for a climax in the end". Gudipoodi Srihari of The Hindu wrote that "The trust is towards the action sequences. None of the cast apart from Vani Viswanath displays any histrionics. Fight composer Vijay has enough work in hand and editor speeded up the fights to unbelievable levels for thrills. There is enough in this film for action lovers". Mithun Verma of Full Hyderabad wrote that "Ramlaxman, those twins, are impossible to tell apart. They're like the two loaves of bread with us sandwiched between them while the director hungrily hogs on. With Vani Vishwanath and a whole lot of other masala girls in it, it was a bitter disappointment too much to swallow for a huge lot among the audience as there were no saucy rain songs. Actually no songs at all. Sorry to inform you Mr. Sagar, but your experiment has bombed pathetically".
