= Ranjitha =

Indian actress and Prime Minister of the micronation of Kailaasa

- Occupation: Actress
- Years active: 1993–2010
- Known for: Prime Minister of Kailaasa (since 2023)

Ranjitha is an Indian former actress who appeared in Tamil, Malayalam, Telugu and Kannada films during her career. Since 2023, she is known to be serving as the Prime Minister of Kailaasa, a self-proclaimed micronation promoted by Nithyananda.

== Personal life ==
In 2010, Nithyananda said he was in a relationship with Ranjitha, and officially made the announcement of both of them living together as partners official.

In 2010, Sun TV telecasted a video recording that claimed to show Ranjitha and Nithyananda in a bedroom. The story became viral among news media in Tamil Nadu. They both claimed the video to be fabricated and accused Sun TV of extortion. A Forensic Sciences Laboratory in Bengaluru confirmed that the video appeared to be that of Nithyananda and Ranjitha. Ranjitha filed a complaint with High Court of Karnataka against news channels. Various news channels were ordered to apologize to Ranjitha for violating the complainant's privacy and dignity.

In 2013, she took up sannyasa under Nithyananda.

=== Prime Minister of Kailaasa ===
In 2023, a website associated with Nithyananda displayed the name 'Nithyanandamayi Swami' alongside an image of Ranjitha, bearing the title of the Prime Minister of Kailaasa, a self-proclaimed Hindu state.

== Filmography ==
=== Tamil ===
Year	Film	Role	Notes
1992	Nadodi Thendral	Poonguruvi	
1992	Pondatti Rajyam	Bharathi	
1992	Kizhakku Veedhi	Kalpana	
1993	Walter Vetrivel	Meena	
1993	Madurai Meenakshi	Meenakshi	
1993	Mutrugai	Gowri	
1993	Band Master	Meenakshi	
1994	Amaidhi Padai	Kuyili	
1994	Veettai Paaru Naattai Paaru	Devi	
1994	Adharmam	Ranjitham	
1994	Jai Hind	Priya	
1994	Thozhar Pandian	Soundarya	
1994	En Aasai Machan	Meenakshi	
1994	Periya Marudhu	Kaveri	
1994	Atha Maga Rathiname	Pandiamma	
1995	Karuppu Nila	Divya	
1995	Thottil Kuzhandhai	Raani	
1995	Karnaa	Amudha	
1995	Chinna Vathiyar	Mythili	
1995	Thamizhachi	Thamizhselvi	
1995	Paattu Vaathiyar	Deivanai	
1995	Makkal Aatchi	Parvathi	
1995	Seethanam	Radha	
1996	Thayagam	Shakeela	
1996	Musthaffaa	Kavitha	
1996	Purushan Pondatti	Rajeswari	
1997	Pagaivan	Esther	
1998	Urimai Por	Ranji	
1999	Poovellam Kettuppar	Herself	Cameo appearance
1999	Taj Mahal	Machakanni's sister-in-law	
2000	Independence Day	Ranjitha	
2001	Maayan	Gurumayi	
2003	Aahaa Ethanai Azhagu	Chandru's sister-in-law	
2005	Amudhae	Susi	Guest appearance
2005	Selvam	Dr. Lakshmi	
2006	Amirtham	Collector	
2006	Sasanam	Saroji	
2006	Nenjil Jil Jil	Kalyani	
2007	Maya Kannadi	Herself	Cameo appearance
2007	Dhandayuthapani	Sandhya	
2008	Saroja		Special appearance
2008	Bommalattam	Rana's wife	
2009	Azhagar Malai	Malar	
2009	Villu	Pugazh's mother	
2010	Raavanan	Annam	

=== Malayalam ===
Year	Film	Role	Notes
1992	Johnnie Walker	Mridula	
1993	Mafia	Rekha	
1993	Chamayam	Ammu	
1993	Customs Diary	Thara Anthony	
1994	Vishnu	Parvathi	
1995	Sundari Neeyum Sundaran Njanum	Radha	
1995	Sindoora Rekha	Ramani	
1995	Karma	Reshma	
1996	British Market	Mercy	
1996	Swarna Chamaram	Not Released	
1997	Suvarna Simhaasanam	Unnimaya/Swapnasundari	
1997	Oru Yathramozhi	Nandhini	
1998	Thattakam	Leena	
1998	Rakthasakshikal Sindabad	Kuttathi	
1998	Kaikudunna Nilavu	Bhama	
2010	Puthumukhangal	Treesa Jacob	

=== Telugu ===
Year	Film	Role	Notes
1990	Kadapa Reddyamma		
1990	Prema Panjaram		
1993	Naga Shakti		
1994	Captain	Gowri	
1996	Maavi Chiguru	Sudha	
1996	Tata Manavadu	Jyoti	
1996	Rendu Kutumbala Katha		
1997	Super Heroes		
1997	Shubhakankshalu		
1997	Adirindi Guru		
1998	Sri Ramulayya		
2008	Maisamma IPS	Durga	

=== Kannada ===
Year	Film	Role	Notes
1992	Purushotthama		
1993	Shrungara Raja		
1997	Agni IPS	Sneha	
1998	Government		
2000	Independence Day		
2004	Ajju		

=== Hindi ===
Year	Film	Role	Notes
2016	Final Cut of Director	Rana's wife	

=== Television ===
Year	Title	Channel	Language	Ref.
	Singara Chittu		Telugu	
1996	Chinna Chinna Aasai : Bandham	Sun TV	Tamil	
1997	Mainakapakshi	DD Podhigai	Tamil	
2000–2002	Krishnadasi	Sun TV	Tamil	
2000	Manase Mandiram	Gemini TV	Telugu	
2004–2007	Roja	Jaya TV	Tamil	
2004	Sigaram	Sun TV	Tamil	
2007–2008	Ammayi Kaapuram	Gemini TV	Telugu	
2008–2009	Thekkathi Ponnu	Kalaignar TV	Tamil	
2008–2010	Manikoondu	Sun TV	Tamil	

== Awards ==
- 1992 – Cinema Express Award for Best New Face Actress - Nadodi Thendral
- 1996 – Nandi Award for Best Supporting Actress - Maavichiguru
