= Amirtham =

- DVD cover
- Directed by: K. Kannan
- Written by: K. Kannan
- Produced by: K. Kannan
- Starring: Ganesh; Navya Nair
- Cinematography: K. V. Mani
- Edited by: V. T. Vijayan
- Music by: Bhavatharini
- Production company: Ezhuttu Pattarai
- Release date: 10 February 2006
- Running time: 125 minutes
- Country: India
- Language: Tamil

Amirtham (transl. Amrita) is a 2006 Indian Tamil-language drama film produced, written and directed by K. Kannan, making his directorial debut. The film stars newcomer Ganesh and Navya Nair, with Girish Karnad, Anuradha Krishnamoorthy, Rajeev, Rekha, Yugendran and Madhura, playing supporting roles. The music was composed by Bhavatharini with cinematography by K. V. Mani and editing by V. T. Vijayan. The film released on 10 February 2006.

== Plot ==
In a village called Mukkudal, the devout Brahmin Ramaswamy Iyengar is a poor temple priest living a peaceful life with his wife Rukkumani and soft-spoken daughter Amirtha. The villagers greatly respect Ramaswamy Iyengar for his goodness. In the same temple, Pasupathi Pillai is a Nadaswaram exponent and a rich person who has a good relationship with Ramaswamy Iyengar. He has a wife, a son studying in the city, and a daughter born to him and his wife's sister. Pasupathi Pillai's son Amirtham returns to the village after completing his engineering degree. Amirtham is an outspoken atheist and rationalist. Thereafter, Amirtha falls in love with Amirtham, while Amirtham's half-sister Sorna is killed by her sadist husband Veerayan.

Rukkumani then learns of her daughter's love with the Nadaswaram exponent's son Amirtham, and she supports her daughter's love affair. Rukkumani even convinced Amirtham's mother to support their love. However, when Amritha declares his feelings to Amirtham, he rejects her proposals because he does not want to affect the friendship between his father and her father. Amirtham then leaves the village and returns in the city.

In the meantime, petroleum geologists find petroleum under the temple belt, and the government asks the villagers to leave the village for oil drilling and extracting the petroleum in the village. The villagers oppose the move by the government, and in the process, the police arrest Ramasamy Iyengar. Amirtham comes back to the village to protest against the demolition of the temple. In a fight between the villagers and the police, Amirtham is shot dead. Afterwards, the Supreme Court stops the demolition of the temple and forces the people to vacate the village. Pasupathi Pillai and his wife leave their place with a heavy heart but to their great surprise, Amirtha decides to go with them, thus becoming their daughter.

== Cast ==
- Ganesh as Amirtham
- Navya Nair as Amirtha
- Girish Karnad as Ramaswamy Iyengar
- Anuradha Krishnamoorthy as Rukkumani
- Rajeev as Pasupathi Pillai
- Rekha as Pasupathi Pillai's wife
- Yugendran as Veerayan
- Madhura as Sorna
- Nizhalgal Ravi as Police Inspector
- Ranjitha as Collector
- Subhalekha Sudhakar as Sadagopan
- Priyadarshini as Journalist

== Production ==
K. Kannan, made his debut as director of this venture. The film deal with the ever-existing divide between rationalism and theism. Malayalam actress Navya Nair was signed to play an Iyengar girl opposite Ganesh, a new face. Carnatic musician Anuradha Krishnamurthy would make her big screen debut. The film was shot in Haridwar, Melukote and Varanasi.

== Soundtrack ==
The music was composed by Bhavatharini.

| No. | Title | Singer(s) | Length |
|---|---|---|---|
| 1. | "Machango Mamango" | Ilaiyaraaja | 1:14 |
| 2. | "Enn Kadhale" | Hariharan, Mathangi Jagdish | 4:17 |
| 3. | "Mugalineme" | Sujatha Mohan | 4:04 |
| 4. | "Thee Thee" | Karthik, Chinmayi | 3:39 |

== Reception ==
A reviewer of The Hindu said, "Kannan brings in the commercial element through duets and dream songs. His profound, thought-provoking dialogue in 'Vedam Pudhidhu' and now in 'Amirtham' will remain unforgettable for long. As a dialogue writer Kannan shines. But his story is bogged down by too many issues". Malini Mannath of Chennai Online wrote, "To make a film with a rural backdrop and a traditional, cultural ambience and to depict the tussle between modernity and tradition, atheism and belief, seems to be the director's intention. And while he's got the ambience right, unfortunately, he's not been able to translate all his ideas, the way he wanted to, successfully on to the screen". A critic from Sify wrote, "On the whole Kannan deserves a pat on his back for making a film which is totally devoid of any masalas. Amirtham is a brave attempt at good cinema".
