= Suvarna Sundari (2023 film) =

- Theatrical release poster
- Directed by: Surendra Madarapu
- Written by: Surendra Madarapu
- Produced by: ML Lakshmi
- Starring: Jaya Prada; Sakshi Chaudhary; Poorna; Avinash Yelandur; Kota Srinivasa Rao; P. Sai Kumar; Nagineedu; Satya Prakash
- Cinematography: Eshwar Yellumahanthi
- Edited by: Prawin Pudi
- Music by: Sai Karthik
- Production company: S Team Pictures
- Release date: 3 February 2023
- Running time: 125 minutes
- Country: India
- Language: Telugu

Suvarna Sundari is a 2023 Indian Telugu film directed by Surendra Madarapu, produced by ML Lakshmi under S Team Pictures banner. The music was by Sai Karthik. The film was edited by Prawin Pudi. It starred Jaya Prada, Sakshi Chaudhary, Poorna, Avinash Yelandur, Kota Srinivasa Rao, P. Sai Kumar, Nagineedu and Satya Prakash.

== Plot ==
The film is set in the fifteenth, eighteenth, nineteenth, and modern eras. The three main characters in the film are Trinethri Idol, portrayed by Poorna, Sakshi, and Jaya-Pradha. The narrative talks about the changes from the 15th to the 21st century.

== Cast ==
- Jaya Prada as Vishalakshi
- Sakshi Chaudhary as Sakshi
- Poorna as Anjali
- Avinash Yelandur as Raja Ram Bahadur
- Kota Srinivasa Rao as a priest
- P. Sai Kumar
- Nagineedu as a sage
- Satya Prakash

== Production ==
The film began production in 2017.

== Soundtrack ==
Suvarna Sundari

Soundtrack album by Sai Karthik
- Released: 2019
- Genre: Feature film soundtrack
- Length: 10:04
- Language: Telugu
- Label: Aditya Music

Sai Karthik chronology
Triple Riding (2022)	Suvarna Sundari (2019)	Meter (2023)
External audio
- Suvarna Sundari – Jukebox on YouTube

The soundtrack was composed by Sai Karthik.

Track listing
No.	Title	Lyrics	Singer(s)	Length
1.	"Kanulu Chudani"	B. Subbaraya Sharma	Sameera Bharadwaj	2:53
2.	"Sararo Sararo"	Suresh Banisetti	Revanth, Bhargavi Pillai	4:06
3.	"Saho Saarva Bhoumi"	Purna Chary	Saketh, Sai Charan, Raghu Ram, Hymath, M. L. Shruthi, M. L. Gayathri	1:25
4.	"Pove Chinnari"	Ramajogayya Sastry	M. L. Shruthi	1:40
Total length:				10:04

== Reception ==
A critic from Sakshi Post gave the film two and three-fourths out of five stars and wrote, "The first half, however, has got pacing issues. The staging of the first act has no hiccups. However, later on, pacing issues crop up. Thankfully, the second half is tight." Paul Nicodemus of The Times of India gave it two-and-a-half out of five stars and wrote, "Overall, the horror thriller, written and directed by MSN Surya aims for epic storytelling, manages a few genuine scares and suffers from cliches."
