= Vedham Pudhithu =

1987 film by Bharathiraja

- Theatrical release poster
- Directed by: Bharathiraja
- Screenplay by: Bharathiraja
- Based on: Saadhigal Illaiyadi Papa by K. Kannan
- Starring: Sathyaraj; Saritha; Amala
- Cinematography: B. Kannan
- Edited by: P. Mohan Raj
- Music by: Devendran
- Production company: Janani Art Creations
- Release date: 27 December 1987
- Running time: 130 minutes
- Country: India
- Language: Tamil

Vedham Pudhithu (/veɪðəm pʊðɪðʊ/ trans. A New Gospel) is a 1987 Indian Tamil-language drama film directed and co-written by Bharathiraja. It is based on the play Saadhigal Illaiyadi Papa by K. Kannan, who wrote the film adaptation's dialogues and became known as Vedham Pudhithu Kannan. The film stars Sathyaraj, Saritha and Amala, with Raja, Charuhasan, Nizhalgal Ravi, Janagaraj and Master Dasarathi in supporting roles. It revolves around an atheist whose son falls in love with a Brahmin woman in the same village, leading to catastrophic consequences.

Vedham Pudhithu criticises the caste system, Tamil Brahminism and their hypocrisies. It was released on 27 December 1987, and became controversial for its depiction of Tamil Brahmins, with the Tamil Nadu Brahmins Association calling for its banning. Despite this, it became a critical and commercial success. The film won three Filmfare Awards South – Best Film – Tamil, Best Director – Tamil and Best Actor – Tamil (Sathyaraj) – and two National Film Awards – Best Film on Other Social Issues and Best Editing (P. Mohan Raj).

== Plot ==
Balu Thevar and his wife Pechi live in a village and belong to a land-owning caste (Thevar), held supposedly lower in the Vedic caste system hierarchy than Brahmins. Balu is an atheist and speaks openly against the caste system, but is nevertheless tolerated by the villagers because he is generous in helping others in need. Their son Sankarapandi has just returned from the city, having completed his education. He meets Vaidehi, the daughter of a Tamil Brahmin priest Neelakanta Sastrigal, and they fall in love.

One night, Sankarapandi and Vaidehi are together in a temple, when Balu is discovered after hiding Vaidehi. To atone for his son's "crime," Balu prostrates before the Brahmins. Afterwards Vaidehi tells her father about their love, who then tells Balu. Neelakanta tries to marry her off to another man in a neighbouring village, but she fakes her death and hides in the house of a forest ranger. Thinking that Vaidehi is dead, Neelakanta confronts Sankarapandi at a waterfall and accuses him of causing her death. During the confrontation, Sankarapandi accidentally falls, but holds onto a plant. Neelakanta tries to save him, but both fall to their deaths.

Vaidehi's younger brother Sankara, who is devoutly studying the Vedas and passing through the student phase of his Brahmin life, is left orphaned. Being considered inauspicious, since his mother, father, and sister are all dead, no one from the Brahmin community wants to take care of him. He thus wanders the streets begging for food. Balu, bothered by this, and having lost his own son, starts raising Sankara as his own son. Balu and Pechi quit eating meat, to not offend Sankara. However, since Sankara has been eating in a lower caste home, he is rejected by his community from learning the Vedas.

Pechi, enraged with Sankara's ostracisation, promises to educate him in an English-medium school. Balu later makes fun of Sankara, telling him that it is not important to learn Vedas and worry about caste. At this point, Sankara notes Balu's own hypocrisy: his preference for using his caste name (Thevar), while at the same time professing against the caste system. Balu sees the merit in this argument, and immediately abandons all his weapons, symbols of his Thevar status, by immersing them in a river, and stops referring to himself by his caste name.

Vaidehi, not knowing of Sankarapandi and her own father's death, tells the forest ranger about her love, after which he promises to reunite them. The forest ranger comes to the village and finds out what has happened. After returning, he informs Vaidehi. Vaidehi, then sadly returns to her village, tells Pechi to take care of her younger brother for the rest of his life and prepares to leave. She reunites with Sankara.

Krishna Iyer, who had wanted to marry Vaidehi but was rebuked, sees her return. He aggravates the villagers with news of Vaidehi's return and says it is inauspicious for the village, since her last death rites have already been performed. Krishna adds that it is improper for Brahmins to live in a non-Brahmin house; He then sets some hay on fire and tells the villagers it is God's disapproval of these two "crimes". Krishna assembles a mob towards Balu's house, and they demand Balu throw Vaidehi out. Balu refuses, a fight breaks out, and in the ensuing scuffle, he is stabbed and dies. His final request is for the villagers to live in unity, and not let caste divide them.

The next day, Sankara, having lost two fathers, removes his poonal and immerses it in a stream, disgusted with and in open defiance of Brahminical beliefs, while performing the last rites of Balu as though he were his own son.

== Cast ==
- Sathyaraj as Balu Thevar
- Saritha as Pechi
- Amala as Vaidehi
- Raja as Sankarapandi
- Charuhasan as Neelakanta Sastrigal
- Nizhalgal Ravi as the forest ranger
- Janagaraj as Krishna Iyer
- Master Dasarathi as Sankara
- Ilavarasu as Balu Thevar's nephew
- Kullamani
- Periya Karuppu Thevar

== Production ==
Vedham Pudhithu, written and directed by Bharathiraja, is based on K. Kannan's play Saadhigal Illaiyadi Papa. Kannan wrote the film adaptation's dialogues. This was Sathyaraj's third appearance in a Bharathiraja film after Muthal Mariyathai (1985) and Kadalora Kavithaigal (1986). He found it comfortable playing the atheist character Balu Thevar, due to being a follower of the atheist/rationalist Periyar. Sathyaraj wore a wig to play the character. It is the screen debut of B. Kanakarajsamy, who worked as an electrician in Kadalora Kavithaigal. According to Kanakarajsamy, "It was a group role. I was asked to walk up and down a street". Filming took place predominantly in Mysore, while the song "Kannukkul Nooru Nilava" was filmed at Melukote.

== Themes ==
Vedham Pudhithu criticises the caste system and Tamil Brahminism. Ashish Rajadhyaksha and Paul Willemen, in Encyclopaedia of Indian Cinema, believe the film purports to "merge humanist values into religious ritual". They also consider that, like other Bharathiraja films, it has "the local village deity as dramatic pivot".

== Soundtrack ==
The music was composed by Devendran while the lyrics were written by Vairamuthu. Due to differences with his usual composer Ilaiyaraaja, Bharathiraja chose Devendran to compose this film's music. Devendran revealed that he had composed a fusion tune which he had slightly modified as "Kannukkul Nooru Nilava". The song is set in Shanmukhapriya raga, and "Sandhikka Thudittaen" is set in Poorvikalyani.

Track listing
No.	Title	Singer(s)	Length
1.	"Kannukkul Nooru Nilava"	S. P. Balasubrahmanyam, K. S. Chithra	5:14
2.	"Mandhiram Sonnen"	Mano, S. Janaki	4:53
3.	"Putham Puthu Olai"	K. S. Chithra	4:55
4.	"Mattu Vandi Salai"	Malaysia Vasudevan	4:06
5.	"Sandhikka Thudittaen"	S. P. Balasubrahmanyam, S. Janaki	4:58
Total length:			24:06

== Release and reception ==
Vedham Pudhithu was released on 27 December 1987. Before release, the censor board objected to the scene where people carry a saint and Balu Thevar commenting on it; as a result the film was stuck in limbo, facing uncertainty over its release. A special screening was later arranged for M. G. Ramachandran, then the Chief Minister of Tamil Nadu, at his request. He saw the film, appreciated Sathyaraj's performance, and the film was given clearance for release.

Ananda Vikatan rated the film 50 out of 100, saying Bharathiraja had moved up to the next step in his career with this film, several scenes were hearttrending and there itself the film achieved success. Jayamanmadhan (a duo) of Kalki praised the film for various aspects, including Bharathiraja's unique storytelling style, the cast performances, Devendran's music and Vairamuthu's lyrics. The duo compared the film to a kolam, albeit a hastily made one, but still worth watching. Though the film became controversial for its depiction of Tamil Brahmins and the Tamil Nadu Brahmins Association called for its banning, despite having been certified "U" (universal) by the censor board without cuts, it became a critical and commercial success, running for over 150 days in theatres. Kannan later came to be known as Vedham Pudhithu Kannan.

== Accolades ==
At a July 1988 event organised by the Cine Technicians Association of South India meant to commemorate the platinum jubilee of Indian cinema, Bharathiraja received a newly created "MGR Award" for directing the film. According to Sathyaraj, he was considered for the Tamil Nadu State Film Award for Best Actor, but missed out on a technicality.

Event (Note: Awards, festivals and organisations are in alphabetical order.)	Category	Recipient(s)	Ref.
35th Filmfare Awards South	Best Film – Tamil	Vedham Pudhithu	
35th Filmfare Awards South	Best Director – Tamil	Bharathiraja	
35th Filmfare Awards South	Best Actor – Tamil	Sathyaraj	
35th National Film Awards	Best Film on Other Social Issues	Vedham Pudhithu	
35th National Film Awards	Best Editing	P. Mohan Raj	

== See also ==
- Portrayal of Tamil Brahmins in popular media

== Bibliography ==
- Dhananjayan, G. (2014). Pride of Tamil Cinema: 1931–2013. Blue Ocean Publishers. OCLC 898765509.
- Rajadhyaksha, Ashish; Willemen, Paul (1998) [1994]. Encyclopaedia of Indian Cinema. British Film Institute and Oxford University Press. ISBN 0-19-563579-5.
