= Vaettiya Madichu Kattu =

1998 film by K. Bhagyaraj

- Title card
- Directed by: K. Bhagyaraj
- Written by: K. Bhagyaraj
- Produced by: Poornima Bhagyaraj
- Starring: K. Bhagyaraj; Nagma; Sai Kumar; Shanthanu
- Cinematography: K. S. Prakash Rao
- Edited by: R. V. K. Madhavan; Jaikumar S.
- Music by: Deva
- Production company: Saranya Cine Creations
- Release date: 6 March 1998
- Country: India
- Language: Tamil

Vaettiya Madichu Kattu (transl. Tie the Dhoti) is a 1998 Indian Tamil-language action comedy film written and directed by K. Bhagyaraj. The film stars himself in lead role with his real-life son Shanthanu portraying his son with Nagma and Sai Kumar playing supporting roles. It was released on 6 March 1998. The film was simultaneously shot in Hindi as Papa The Great, which had a delayed release in 2000. The film was remade in Kannada as Vishalakshammana Ganda (2001).

== Plot ==
Jaiprakash BE is a cowardly engineer based in Mumbai. A Tamilian, he lives with his wife and his son Sonu. One day, he meets a fellow Tamilian (S. S. Chandran) who is in Mumbai to search for his sister and brother-in-law, who later turn out to be thieves. He gives him shelter for few days in his house. Later, Jaiprakash sees a murder committed by Raaka, and testifies against him in the court, after which Raaka challenges to kill him and later escapes from the jail. Meanwhile, Madurai Muthupandi stays in Jai's house pretending to be his and Pooja's uncle in front of either of them. Later it is revealed that Muthupandi was invited to Mumbai by Chandran, who wanted to pay for the gratitude Jai had done to him. In a celebration during Holi festival Muthupandi is forced to drink Bhaang by Jai and others. He gets stabbed twice in an attempt to protect Jai from Raaka and kills one of Raaka's men in the process. On persuasion from his wife, Jai decides to leave for Chennai along with his family forever, and arranges to pay for Muthupandi's treatment, leaving Chandran to take care of him.

As Jaiprakash is about to leave his colony with his wife and son, Raaka arrives along with his men to kill him. He is accosted by Sonu, Jai's son, who has been perceiving his father as a brave and courageous man all along. Sonu calls Jai to fight Raaka and his men. Jai's wife asks him to run away, but Jai, who feels that his son will be a coward all his life if he runs away, steps forward bravely to face Raaka without fearing for his life. He defeats all of Raaka'a men and breaks both of Raaka's hands in a fight. Muthupandi, who has arrived from the hospital, then wishes Jai good luck for the rest of his life. The film ends with Jai and Sonu hugging each other.

== Cast ==
- K. Bhagyaraj as Jaiprakash BE
- Nagma as Pooja Jaiprakash
- Shanthanu Bhagyaraj as Sonu
- Sai Kumar as Madurai Muthupandi
- Bayilvan Ranganathan
- S. S. Chandran as a Tamilian in Mumbai
- Razak Khan
- Satya Prakash as Raaka
- Junior Balaiah
- Anil Dhawan
- Mahavir Shah
- Pallavi

== Production ==
The film was initially planned as a Tamil-Hindi bilingual, though the Hindi version Papa The Great was briefly stalled following the assassination of Gulshan Kumar, who had agreed to produce the film. Bhagyaraj approached Rajinikanth to make a cameo appearance but he refused to do it.

== Soundtrack ==
Soundtrack was composed by Deva.

Song	Singers	Lyrics	Length
"Andha Neelakuyil"	Swarnalatha, Mano	Pa. Vijay	05:04
"Kichu Kichu Thambulam"	G. V. Prakash Kumar, Harini	Mayilvaganan	05:23
"Un Peyar Sollave"	K. S. Chithra, Hariharan	Pa. Vijay	05:19
"Vaanuyarntha Everestai"	Mano, K. S. Chithra	Pa. Vijay	04:51
"Vaigai Vellam"	Malaysia Vasudevan, Krishnaraj, G. V. Prakash Kumar	Pa. Vijay	05:06

== Reception ==
Ji of Kalki wrote as usual the director has carefully woven the screenplay and the logic is preserved as the events are predictable. But the Bhagyaraj touch feels halved as there are very few plot twists that can give the dense, sequential story more interest and pressure. D. S. Ramanujam of The Hindu wrote "Actor-director K. Bhagyaraj regains some lost ground in his own production Saranya Cine Creations, Vettiyae Madichchu Kattu where his eight-year-old son Chandanu makes a bright debut. The boy plays the doting son who believes his father is a fearless personality capable of handling hardcore elements. Here such demanding situations are either managed by the hero with clever excuses or by turn of events which favour the hero, all carrying the hallmark of Bhagyaraj's screenplay".
