= Dakota Express =

- VCD cover
- Directed by: M. S. Rajashekar
- Written by: B. A. Madhu (Dialogues)
- Screenplay by: M. S. Rajashekhar
- Story by: Govind Padman Mahesh Mithra
- Based on: Ee Parakkum Thalika (2001)
- Produced by: Rockline Venkatesh
- Starring: Rockline Venkatesh; Om Prakash Rao
- Cinematography: R. Janardhan Babu
- Edited by: Shyam Yadav
- Music by: Hamsalekha
- Production company: Rockline Productions
- Distributed by: Bahar Films
- Release date: 11 April 2002
- Running time: 154 minutes
- Country: India
- Language: Kannada

Dakota Express (transl. Rundown Express) (Note: "Dakota" is a Kannada slang term denoting poor quality.) is a 2002 Kannada-language comedy film, a remake of the 2001 Malayalam film Ee Parakkum Thalika. It was produced by Rockline Venkatesh and directed by M. S. Rajashekar. The film stars Rockline Venkatesh and Om Prakash Rao.

== Plot ==
Krishna owns an old bus and he is facing lot of problems due to the pathetic condition of the bus. He sold many valuable things to maintain this bus. His friend Sundar was his only companion. A mouse was also there as a character. It ate the passport of Sundar and Sundar went after that mouse. The story took a turn when Gayathri entered the bus as a nomad. She was actually the daughter of a minister. Her father forced her to join politics. So she left home. The police traced her out and had taken her back. Her father was making arrangements for her marriage with someone else. Meanwhile, Krishna realised that he cannot live without Gayathri. Krishna and Sundar secretly entered her house and finally all ended well by winning the heart of her father.

== Cast ==
- Rockline Venkatesh as Krishna
- Om Prakash Rao as Sundara
- Amrutha as Gayathri Devi
- Doddanna as Circle Inspector Ugra Narasimha
- Lokanath as Bank Manager Gundurao
- Malathi Sardeshpande
- Shivadhwaj
- M. S. Umesh
- Shivaji Rao Jadhav
- Ashok as Home Minister Rajashekhar Patil
- Shyam Yadav as Kashi
- Sarigama Viji as Bhatta
- Rathnakar
- Bangalore Nagesh
- Mimicry Dayanand

== Soundtrack ==
The music was composed and written by Hamsalekha.

Track listing
No.	Title	Lyrics	Singer(s)	Length
1.	"Bassu Bassu"	Hamsalekha	S. P. Balasubrahmanyam
2.	"O God O God"	Hamsalekha	S. P. Balasubrahmanyam	4:25
3.	"Jhum Anthu"	Hamsalekha	K. S. Chithra, Rajesh Krishnan
4.	"Bogase Kangala"	Hamsalekha	K. J. Yesudas
5.	"Gulaabi Hoove"	Hamsalekha	K. J. Yesudas

== Reception ==
Chitraloka.com wrote, "Director M.S.Rajasekhar deserves compliments as he has really chiseled out or brought out a proper shape from a shapeless rock given to him."
