= Nithyananda =

Indian godman and founder of the micronation of Kailaasa

Swami Nithyananda
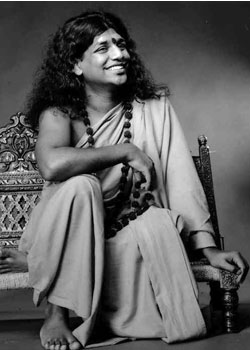

Personal life
- Born: Arunachalam Rajasekaran; 1 January 1978 (age 48) Tiruvannamalai, Tamil Nadu, India

Religious life
- Religion: Hinduism
- Founder of: Nithyananda Dhyanapeetam
- Philosophy: Advaita Vedanta

Nithyananda (born Arunachalam Rajasekaran; (Note: In this Indian name, the name Arunachalam is a patronymic, and the person is commonly called by the given name, Rajasekaran.) 1 January 1978) is an Indian spiritual leader and a self-styled godman. He has been described by several media outlets, including The Daily Telegraph, as a controversial figure and cult leader. He is the founder of Nithyananda Dhyanapeetam, a trust that owns temples, gurukulas, and ashrams in many countries. He is also the founding head of the micronation of Kailaasa.

Following charges of rape and abduction filed in Indian courts, Nithyananda fled India and has remained in hiding since 2019. He is the subject of a court-issued non-bailable warrant relating to the allegations. Nithyananda is also wanted since 2019 for unrelated fraud charges in France. In 2020, he announced the founding of his own self-proclaimed island nation called Kailaasa, though some evidence suggests he had been promoting the idea for around 20 years.

A number of mainstream news outlets, inside and outside India, and a TV documentary series on Discovery+ have referred to the organisation as a cult, its leader as a conman, and his micronation of Kailaasa a scam; although his organization has denied any wrongdoing.

== Early life ==
Nithyananda was born Arunachalam Rajasekaran in Tiruvannamalai, Tamil Nadu, to father Arunachalam and mother Lokanayaki. He belongs to the Saiva Vellala community. Sources conflict as to his birth date – a 2003 United States visa gave a date of 13 March 1977, while a sworn affidavit in a 2010 Karnataka High Court case mentioned 1 January 1978.

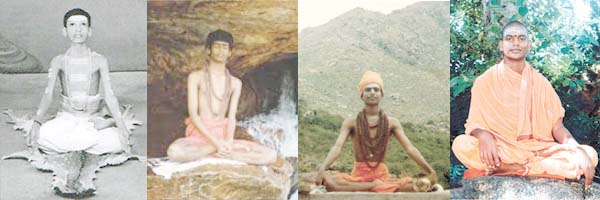
Nithyananda at various ages

He was first noticed at the age of three by Yogiraj Yogananda Puri. He claims to have had powerful spiritual experiences from age 12 and to have experienced full enlightenment at 22.

In 2002 (age 24), he began his public life under the name Nithyananda. He says that this name was given to him by Mahavatar Babaji in a mystical experience during his monastic wandering days in the Himalayas. In 2003, he started his ashram Dhyanapeetam in Bidadi near Bangalore, Karnataka.

== Career ==
Nithyananda was formerly a chairman of Florida-based Hindu University of America. In 2012, Nithyananda was recognized as one of the "100 Most Spiritually Influential Living People" by Watkins' Mind Body Spirit magazine. Also in April 2012, Nithyananda was appointed the 293rd pontiff of Madurai Adheenam., however the senior pontiff removed him from this position few months later, without giving any explanation. In February 2013, the title of Mahamandaleshwar was conferred on Nithyananda in a closed ceremony by the Panchayati Mahanirvani Akhara.

Nithyananda Dhyanapeetam, a religious organisation founded by Nithyananda, hosts cultural events in United States as well as India. They hold two Guinness World Records: one for the largest rope yoga class, and one for the largest pole yoga (mallakhamba) class.

== Claims of paranormal abilities ==
Nithyananda has made several pseudoscientific claims, including that he delayed the sunrise for 40 minutes, that he could make cattle speak in Tamil and Sanskrit, and that he could disprove the correctness of the mass-energy equivalence formula E = mc^{2}.

He has claimed to have discovered over 400 siddhis, or paranormal abilities, expressible by humans and alleges having initiated his disciples into 60 such powers including kundalini and third-eye awakening. He has since asserted he would open the third eye, for anyone, free of charge by 2021, claiming that the person would be able to see through smog and walls. Disciples of Nithyananda claim that he gave initiations through "third eye" to a class of 82 blind children, thus curing them of blindness. Skeptic Narendra Nayak challenged Nithyananda to prove his claims.

Nithyananda has also claimed that he and his followers were able to perform activities like extrasensory perception, materialisation, body scanning, increasing height, and remote viewing, and that they had the ability to find lost objects.

Nithananda has also claimed to be a human avatar of the Hindu divinity Paramashiva (the meaning of his epithet Nithyananda Paramashivam).

== Controversies ==
In 2010, Sun TV telecast video recordings that claimed to show Nithyananda and an actress Ranjitha (who was one of his followers) in a bedroom. The story became viral among news media in Tamil Nadu. Nithyananda and Ranjitha claimed the video to be fabricated and accused Sun TV of extortion. A forensic sciences laboratory in Bengaluru confirmed that the video appeared to be that of Nithyananda and Ranjitha. Sun TV and other media channels since then were subject to various lawsuits. Ranjitha filed a complaint with the High Court of Karnataka against news channels. Channels were ordered to apologize to Ranjitha for violating the complainant's privacy and dignity.

In 2010, a United States citizen who was a disciple of Nithyananda accused him of raping her in the US and in India repeatedly over the course of five years. She filed a complaint with the police department of Ann Arbor, Michigan, who did not commence any formal investigation. She also filed a complaint with the Karnataka Police in India. On 19 February 2018, the Third Additional District and Sessions Court in Ramanagara ordered the framing of charges against Nithyananda and five others in relation to the case. Criminal revision petitions by the accused were dismissed in the Karnataka High Court on 16 May 2018. An appeal against the High Court decision in the Supreme Court of India, in which all of the accused pleaded not guilty (except for one who was absent from court), was dismissed on 1 June 2018, following which charges were framed in the Ramanagara court on 4 June. However, since 2019 Nithyananda is also wanted for financial crime related investigations in France. By January 2020, Interpol had issued a blue notice in his name, seeking to determine his location. In August 2022, the Third Additional District and Sessions Court in Ramanagara issued a non-bailable warrant against Nithyananda following multiple orders to appear in court.

In 2019, a couple from Tamil Nadu approached the High Court of Gujarat claiming that three of their four children were taken to Nithyananda's ashram in Ahmedabad from Bangalore without their knowledge; the couple sought return of their children to their custody. A first information report (FIR) for alleged abduction was filed by the Gujarat Police in relation to the case on 17 November 2019. In affidavits filed in the Gujarat High Court from various locations in the Americas, two of the missing children, who were by that time adults, rejected their father's claim that they have been detained forcibly. In a joint live video statement, the two girls further claimed that their father had plotted the abduction controversy after his name cropped up in an embezzlement case. On 2 February 2024, the High Court of Gujrat dismissed the habeas corpus filed by the daughter's father. The court reached this conclusion after interviewing the daughters via video conference. The court noted that the daughters are adults and mature and are consciously residing at a place (Jamaica) and following a spiritual path.

Nithyananda was the subject of the 2022 Discovery+ docu-series My Daughter Joined a Cult, streamed internationally.

== Flight from India ==
On 20 November 2019, the Gujarat Police issued a statement that Nithyananda fled India after choosing not to appear at several court hearings. Some senior police officials did not discount the possibility that he was still in India. Nithyananda wrote to the United Nations in 2021, claiming persecution and seeking recognition of his new "Hindu nation" Kailaasa. He also claimed attempts at mob lynching and assassination as reasons he was forced to withdraw himself from Indian society.

The Gujarat Police suspected that he could be shuffling between Ecuador and Trinidad and Tobago, while news reports said that he may have gone to Ecuador because the country does not have an extradition treaty with India. The same month, the Embassy of Ecuador said that it "categorically denies the statement wherever published that Nithyananda was given asylum by Ecuador or has been helped by the Government of Ecuador in purchasing any land or island in South America", but has confirmed Nithyananda had reached Ecuador after he left India, then left soon after his request for international personal protection (refuge) was denied.

The French government also launched a fraud investigation into Nithyananda, after a French national claimed that Nithyananda cheated him out of US$400,000.

== Kailaasa nation ==
In December 2019, Nithyananda claimed that he had created a new "Hindu nation" microstate called Kailaasa (also known as Shrikailasa, Kailasa, and United States of Kailaasa or USK) and claimed to issue passports, currency, and other documents. Nithyananda claims that Kailaasa is the world's only sovereign Hindu nation. Kailaasa has also been described as a network of non-governmental organisations spanning three continents. The general consensus among the mainstream press is that Kailaasa is a fictional "fake country" and even a scam or con.

== Publications ==
- Nithyananda, Paramahamsa (2004). Open the door... let the breeze in!. Life Bliss Foundation. ISBN 978-8190243711.
- Nithyananda, Paramahamsa (2004). Meditation is for You: An Introduction to the Science and Art of Meditation. Life Bliss Foundation. ISBN 978-8190243742.
- Nithyananda, Paramahamsa (2008). Guaranteed Solutions for Lust, Fear, Worry ... Life Bliss Foundation. ISBN 978-1606070314.
- Nithyananda, Paramahamsa (2008). Living Enlightenment. Life Bliss Foundation. ISBN 978-1606070482.
- Nithyananda, Paramahamsa (2009). Arunachala! The Giver of Nithyananda. Nithyananda Yoga & Meditation University. ISBN 978-1606070581.
- Nithyananda, Paramahamsa (2011). Bhagavad Gita Demystified. Nithyananda University. ISBN 978-1606071328.
- Nithyananda, Paramahamsa (2011). Guaranteed Solutions: Spirituality, Meditation & Self-Help. Life Bliss Foundation. ISBN 9781606070314.
- Nithyananda, Paramahamsa (2017). Nithyananda Yoga: Evolution of the New Species. Nithyananda University Press. ISBN 978-1-60607-194-6.
