= Thriller Manju =

Indian stunt coordinator

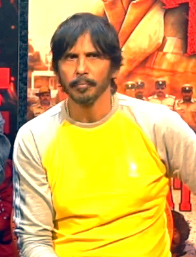
- Thriller Manju in 2022
- Born: Mailasandra Hanumappa Manjunatha Reddy, Mailasandra, Bangalore, Mysore State, India
- Occupations: Stunt coordinator; filmmaker; actor
- Years active: 1985–present

Mailasandra Hanumappa Manjunatha Reddy, known popularly as Thriller Manju, is an Indian stunt coordinator, filmmaker, and actor known for his work in Kannada cinema. He has occasionally also served as screenwriter and choreographer. Apart from Kannada, Manju has also worked in a handful Telugu films. He ventured into film direction with the film, Police Story (1996).

== Early life ==
Manju was born in Mailasandra, a village in Bangalore, to C. Hanumappa Reddy and A. Rukminiamma. He had two siblings: older brother Gurumurthy and younger sister Padmavati. Hanumappa Reddy served as the chief of the village before the family moved to Bangalore city where he began working as an electrical contractor. The family resided in the Basavanagudi, where Manju was educated, at the Kamala Nehru Education Society. With a movie theatre and a martial arts training center in close proximity to his house, he was drawn towards both of these as a kid. He cited Rajkumar and Bruce Lee as his idols growing up.

== Career ==
Manju began his career as a stuntman with Nyayada Kannu (1985). He played the stunt double of one of the characters in the film. Manju had one scene in the film and was shot in the Kanteerava Studios, Bangalore.

Manju's 2010 Kannada film, Jayahe featured himself in the leading roles alongside actors Ayesha and Jai Akash. The film was later dubbed and released in Malayalam and Telugu as Lady Bruce Lee (2011) and into Tamil as Vettai Puli (2013).

== Filmography ==
As director

- Police Story (1996)
- Jackie Chan (1997)
- Thriller Killer (1998)
- One Man Army (1998)
- Om Namah Shivaya (1999)
- Hunter (2003)
- Om Ganesh (2004)
- Police Story 2 (2007)
- Rajani (2009)
- Jayahe (2010)
- Police No. 1 (2011)
- Police Story 3 (2011)

As actor

- Thriller Killer (1998)
- Amar Akbar Anthony (1998)
- Naxalite (2000)
- Narahantaka (2001)
- Supari (2001)
- Mafia (2001)
- Khaki Chokka (2001; Telugu)
- Neethone Vuntanu (2002; Telugu)
- Action No. 1 (2002; Telugu)
- Police Officers (2002)
- Thrisakthi (2002)
- Hunter (2003)
- Bodyguard (2003)
- Rama Krishna (2004)
- Samudra (2004)
- Bhagath (2004)
- Police No. 1 (2011)
- Tyson (2016)
- CBI Sathya (2016)
- Raj Bahadur (2016)
- Dandu (2016)
- Inamdar (2023)
- Mugila Mallige as Muttatti Devaraj(2023)
- JC: The University (2026) as Rowdy Kumari
- Deadly Killer (2026)

As stunt coordinator

- Nyayada Kannu (1985)
- Shrungara Kavya (1993)
- Shhh (1993)
- Lockup Death (1994)
- Om (1995)
- Police Story (1996)
- Khaki Chokka (2001; Telugu) (only some fights)
- Hunter (2003)
- Auto Shankar (2005)
- Veera Madakari (2009)
- Bhimavaram Bullodu (2014)
- Thittivasal (2017; Tamil)
- Sarvasva (2017)
- Jhanshi (TBA)

== Awards and nominations ==
- 1994-95: Karnataka State Film Award for Best Stunt Director (Special Award) - Lockup Death
- 2010: Innovative Film Award for Best Stunt Director
