= Garam (film) =

- Theatrical release poster
- Directed by: Madan
- Written by: Sreenivas Gavireddy (story, dialogues)
- Screenplay by: Madan
- Produced by: Saikumar Pudipeddi
- Starring: Aadi; Adah Sharma; Kabir Duhan Singh
- Cinematography: T. Surendra Reddy
- Edited by: Karthika Srinivas
- Music by: Agasthya
- Production company: Srinivasa Sai Screens
- Release date: 12 February 2016
- Running time: 147 minutes
- Country: India
- Language: Telugu
- Budget: ₹12 crore (US$1.3 million)

Garam (transl. Hot) is a 2016 Indian Telugu-language action romantic comedy film starring Aadi Pudipeddi and Adah Sharma, written and directed by Madan Mohan Reddy, with cinematography by T. Surendra Reddy.

== Plot ==
Varala Babu (Aadi), who is poor at studies, would always face criticism from his father (Tanikella Bharani) and, he is jobless. He is asked to leave the house and challenges his father that he will prove to himself. He leaves for Hyderabad in search of a job, but he ends up falling in love with Sameera (Adah Sharma). In the process of wooing her, Varala Babu comes across Ravi (Chaitanya Krishna), a childhood rival of Babu in studies in a paralyzed and bedridden state in a hospital, and he saves Ravi from the baddies. Sameera is already facing an issue with Biju (Kabir Duhan Singh). Varala Babu is now left with a responsibility to save his friend and loved one from Biju.

== Cast ==
- Aadi as Varala Babu
- Adah Sharma as Sameera
- Kabir Duhan Singh as Biju
- Brahmanandam as Mr. Google
- Posani Krishna Murali as Posani
- Satya Prakash
- Supreeth as Goon
- Chaitanya Krishna as Ravi
- Madhunandan as Bujji, Varalababu's friend
- Shakalaka Shankar as Varalababu's friend
- Nassar as Sameera's father
- Tanikella Bharani as Varala Babu's Father
- Naresh as Ravi's Father
- Vinaya Prasad as Ravi's mother
- Thagubothu Ramesh as Drunkard
- Ester Noronha (special appearance in the song "Garam Garam")

== Production ==
Saikumar produced the film. has stepped in to monitor the production activities of ‘Garam’ Starring his son Aadi in the lead role & the film is directed by Madan cinematography by T. Surendra Reddy. Writer Sreenivas Gavireddy penned the film’s script.

== Soundtrack ==
The music was composed by Agasthya and released by Mango Music.

Garam

Soundtrack album by Agasthya
- Released: Dec 23, 2015
- Recorded: 2015
- Genre: Soundtrack
- Length: 21:03
- Label: Mango Music
- Producer: Agasthya

Agasthya chronology
Naa Samiranga (2013)	Garam (2015)

Track list
No.	Title	Lyrics	Singer(s)	Length
1.	"Garam Garam"	Bhaskarabhatla Ravi Kumar	Naveen Madhav, Hema, Aparna	4:30
2.	"Rabbaa Rabbaa"	Pulagam Chinnarayana	Nakul	3:06
3.	"Chilaka Paapa"	Chaitanya Prasad	Suchith Suresan, M. M. Manasi	4:02
4.	"Sahaara"	Sri Mani	Gaurav Bhangia, Deblin	5:07
5.	"Hogaya Mein"	Chaitanya Prasad	Simha, Amrutha Varshini	3:38
Total length:				21:03

== Release ==
Garam has been released on nearly 500 screens worldwide, which includes 360 screens in Andhra Pradesh and Telangana alongside Nani's Krishna Gaadi Veera Prema Gaadha

== Box office ==
Garam grossed ₹3 crore on opening day at AP/Telangana box office and grossed ₹5 crore on its opening weekend
