= Ananda Jyothi =

- Poster
- Directed by: Chi. Datta Raj
- Written by: Kakolu Saroja Rao (Based on novel Maangalya Maale)
- Produced by: Rockline Venkatesh; Chi Guru Dutt
- Starring: Shiva Rajkumar; Sudharani; Rockline Venkatesh; Chi Guru Dutt
- Cinematography: J G Krishna
- Edited by: S. Manohar
- Music by: Vijayanand
- Production company: Shiva Chitralaya
- Release date: 21 September 1993
- Running time: 136 min
- Country: India
- Language: Kannada

Ananda Jyothi is a 1993 Indian Kannada-language romantic drama film directed by Chi. Datta Raj and based on the novel Maangalya Maale by Kakolu Saroja Rao. The film starred Shiva Rajkumar and Sudharani. The film had a musical score by Vijay Anand and was jointly produced by Rockline Venkatesh and Chi Guru Dutt in his debut production.

== Cast ==
- Shiva Rajkumar as Anand
- Sudharani as Jyothi
- Chi Guru Dutt
- Rockline Venkatesh
- K. S. Ashwath
- Thoogudeepa Srinivas
- Megha
- Girija Lokesh
- Sumithra
- Anjali Sudhakar

== Release ==
The film was released on 21 September 1993 all over Karnataka.

== Soundtrack ==
All the songs are composed and scored by Vijayanand with the lyrics by Chi. Udaya Shankar.

Sl No	Song title	Singer(s)
1	"O Priyathama"	S. P. Balasubrahmanyam, K. S. Chithra
2	"Eno Hosathana"	S. P. Balasubrahmanyam, K. S. Chithra
3	"Honnantha Naadu"	S. P. Balasubrahmanyam
4	"Kannige Kaanuva"	S. P. Balasubrahmanyam, Rajesh Krishnan
5	"Amma Enuva"	Rajkumar
