= Thrill (2008 film) =

- Directed by: B Venugopal
- Produced by: N Ramprasad
- Starring: Satya Prakash; Anoop Kumar
- Music by: S Rajendran; M V Prabhath
- Production company: A R Films
- Release date: 25 July 2008
- Country: India
- Language: Malayalam

Thrill is a 2008 Indian Malayalam-language film directed by B Venugopal starring newcomers. The film follows a group of youngsters who are willing to do anything for money.

== Cast ==
- Satya Prakash as Rahul
- Anoop Kumar as Aneesh Thampan
- Saradha
- Prajoosha
- Pooja Vijayan
- Anil Murali
- Augustine
- Baburaj
- Kanakalatha
- Ramesh
- Sreekutty

== Reception ==
Nowrunning wrote that "Yet another supposedly gripping time-killer. Yet another plot filled with holes wide enough for you to fall through. Yet another miserable opportunity to squander away one and a half hours of your life". Indiaglitz wrote that "If you are wholly prepared for the amazing, unrelenting horridness of a movie, just have a watch. It will certainly better your patience levels, with the ample display of stupidity and lunacy".
