= Deadly Killer =

2026 Indian Kannada language film

- Release poster
- Directed by: Thriller Manju
- Written by: Thriller Manju
- Produced by: Prashant R Tambrallimath
- Starring: Thriller Manju; Abhay Veer; Niviksha Muniratnam
- Cinematography: Mallikarjuna B.R.
- Edited by: Deepu C.S.
- Music by: Vinu Manasu
- Production companies: Keerthi Silver Screen; Vedic Cosmos
- Release date: 3 July 2026
- Running time: 148 minutes
- Country: India
- Language: Kannada

Deadly Killer is a 2026 Indian Kannada language film directed by Thriller Manju. The film stars Abhay Veer, Niviksha Muniratnam, and Thriller Manju in the lead role.

== Cast ==
- Thriller Manju as Don
- Abhay Veer as Jai
- Niviksha Muniratnam as Kaveri
- Lokendra Surya

== Reception ==
Susmita Sameera of The Times of India said that "Despite its premise, Deadly Killer offers little that stands out as either a thriller or a horror film. With an uninspired screenplay and a lack of emotional or dramatic engagement, it ends up being a forgettable outing that rarely rises above its basic premise." A. Sharadhaa of the Cinema Express said that "For fans of Thriller Manju, Deadly Killer is a reminder of why he remains one of Kannada cinema's most respected action directors. But as a comeback after 15 years, it deserved a screenplay that matched the quality of its action. While its characters are constantly on the run, the story itself keeps stopping to catch its breath." Y. Maheswara Reddy of the Bangalore Mirror said that "Abhay Veer makes debut as a full-fledged hero with this movie. It is worth a watch for those who crave action movies."
