= P. Sai Kumar =

Indian actor, dubbing artist, television presenter (born 1960)

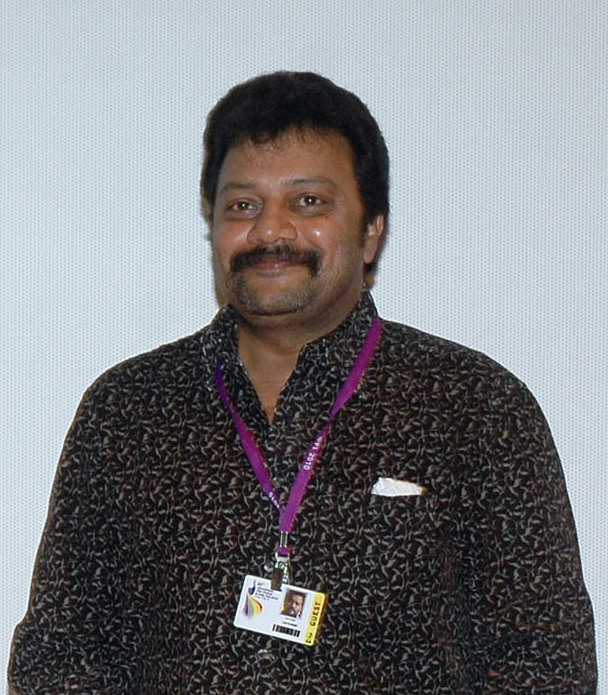
- Sai Kumar at IFFI (2010)
- Born: Pudipeddi Sai Kumar; 27 July 1960 (age 66); Vizianagaram, Andhra Pradesh, India
- Education: Presidency College, Chennai; Madras Christian College
- Occupations: Actor; dubbing artist; television presenter
- Years active: 1976–present
- Spouse: Surekha
- Children: 2, including Aadi
- Father: P. J. Sarma
- Relatives: P. Ravi Shankar (brother); Ayyappa P. Sharma (brother)

Pudipeddi Sai Kumar (born 27 July 1960) is an Indian actor, dubbing artist, and television presenter who works primarily in Telugu and Kannada cinema. He has received three Filmfare Awards, two Nandi Awards, and two South Indian International Movie Awards (SIIMA). His performance in Prasthanam (2010) was included in the "100 Greatest Performances of the Decade" by Film Companion. In addition to acting, he has worked extensively as a dubbing artist.

== Early and personal life ==
Sai Kumar was born to P. J. Sarma and Krishna Jyothi, as one of five children. Sarma moved from Vizianagaram, Andhra Pradesh to Chennai and established himself as an actor and dubbing artist while Jyothi, hails from Bagepalli, Karnataka and has acted in several Kannada films.

Kumar's brothers P. Ravi Shankar and Ayyappa P. Sharma are also actors. They have two sisters. Kumar has a master's degree in Arts from Presidency College, Chennai and completed M.Phil. at Madras Christian College, where he also taught briefly.

Sai Kumar's son Aadi is also an actor in Telugu cinema.

== Film career ==
He started his career at an early age as a dubbing child artist. His father, P. J. Sarma was a leading dubbing artist. Sai Kumar followed in his father's footsteps, having dubbed for Suman and Rajasekhar for many of their films. As a child actor, he appeared in Devudu Chesina Pelli (1975) and Sneham (1977). He resumed acting as an adult, appearing in Challenge (1984), Kalikalam (1991), Major Chandrakanth (1993) and others. He appeared in Tamil movies like Thaiyalkaran (1991), Kaaval Geetham (1992), Vaettiya Madichu Kattu (1998) and portrayed action roles in films such as Aathi (2006), Thenavattu (2008) and Thiruvannamalai (2008).

He appeared in the 1996 Kannada film Police Story, which was also voice dubbed in Telugu and Tamil. His Kannada films Agni IPS (1997), Central Jail (1997), Police Story 2 (2007) were all major hits at the box office and Sai Kumar became a household name in Karnataka. Sai Kumar says, 'I am indebted to Karnataka for making me a star and giving me Police Story during my struggling days.' His Kannada film RangiTaranga was one of the 300 films eligible to be nominated for the Oscars in 2016 and his performance in the film was not only praised by the critics, but also earned him an IIFA Utsavam and SIIMA Award. He produces his son's film Aadi titled Garam (2016).

In 2019, the brothers Sai Kumar, Ravi Shankar and Ayyappa to play a major role in Sriimurali starrer Bharaate. After essaying a number of amazing roles as a male protagonist and a character artiste, Sai Kumar makes OTT debut with Gaalivaana (2022).

== Television career ==
In addition to his films, he also hosted Deal or No Deal on Gemini TV and Etv Kannada in Telugu and Kannada respectively. He also hosted WOW-Sakkhath Kick Kodo game show on ETV Kannada and WOW S1 - Manchi Kick Ichche, WOW S2 game shows on ETV. He hosted a game show, Manam on ETV.

== Awards ==
Nandi Awards

- Nandi Award for Best Villain – Samanyudu (2006)
- Nandi Award for Best Supporting Actor – Prasthanam (2010)

Filmfare Awards

- Filmfare Award for Best Supporting Actor – Telugu - Samanyudu (2006)
- Filmfare Award for Best Supporting Actor – Telugu - Prasthanam (2010)
- Filmfare Award for Best Supporting Actor – Kannada - RangiTaranga (2015)

IIFA Utsavam

- IIFA Award for Best Supporting Actor (Kannada) – RangiTaranga (2015)

CineMAA Awards

- CineMAA Award for Best Supporting Actor – Prasthanam (2010)

SIMA Awards

- SIMA Award for Best Actor in a Negative Role – Bharaate (2019)
- SIMA Award for Best Actor in a Negative Role – RangiTaranga (2015)

Other Awards

- TSR – TV9 Award for Best Villain - Prasthanam (2010)
- Santosham Best Villain Award – Yevadu (2014)

Television Awards (As anchor)

- TV Award 2009 for Best Male Anchor presented by Delhi Telugu Academy in Hyderabad on 8 August 2010.
- 'Best Male Anchor Award' was presented at the AP Cinegoers' 6th Annual TV Awards – 2009 on 28 December 2010 for his anchoring of Wow on ETV Telugu.

== Filmography ==
=== As actor ===
==== Telugu ====
List of P. Sai Kumar Telugu films and roles
Year	Title	Role	Notes
1975	Devudu Chesina Pelli		
1977	Sneham		
1979	Gorintaku		
1981	Maa Voori Pedda Manushulu		
1984	Challenge	Prakasam	
1984	Rustum		
1985	Agni Parvatam		
1985	Vande Mataram		
1985	Maharaju		
1985	Pratighatana		
1985	Jwala	Sarvottama Rao's son	
1987	Yugakarthalu		
1987	Bharatamlo Arjunudu		
1987	Ida Prapancham		
1990	Doctor Bhavani		
1990	Kartavyam		
1990	Neti Dowrjanyam	S.P. Ranjith	
1990	Aayudham	China Venkatarayudu	
1991	Kalikalam		
1991	Amma Rajinama		
1992	Laati	Prithvi	
1992	Rowdy Inspector	Narasimham	
1992	Nani		
1992	Valu Jada Tolu Beltu		
1992	Bangaru Mama		
1992	Prema Vijetha		
1993	Major Chandrakanth		
1993	Paruvu Prathishta		
1994	Pacha Thoranam		
1996	Police Story		
1998	Rowdy Durbar		
1998	Swarnamukhi		
1998	Kodukulu		
1998	Anthahpuram	Prakash	
1999	A. K. 47	Ramu	Also dialogue writer for Tamil dubbed version
2001	Narahari		
2001	Sivanna		
2001	Khaki Chokka	Pratap	
2001	Athanu		
2002	Seema Simham	Simbhu Prasad	
2002	Janam	Jeeva	
2004	Sivaram	Sivaram	
2005	Slokam		
2006	Samanyudu	Bhagavan Raj	
2007	Vijayadasami	Durga Prasad	
2008	Indrajith		
2009	Dhee Ante Dhee		
2010	Prasthanam	Loknath Naidu	
2011	Ayyare	Gajapathi	
2012	Uu Kodathara? Ulikki Padathara?	Bujji	
2012	Shirdi Sai	Nanavali	
2013	Okkadine	Shivaji Rao	
2013	Pavitra		
2013	Jagadguru Adi Shankara	Mandana Misra	
2013	Kamina	Dharma	
2014	Yevadu	Dharma	
2014	Autonagar Surya	Sirisha's father	
2014	Galata		
2015	Pataas	DGP Murali Krishna	
2015	Pandaga Chesko	Sai Reddy	
2015	Bhale Manchi Roju	Shakti	
2016	Sarrainodu	Jaya Prakash "J.P."	
2016	Supreme	Narayana Rao	
2016	Chuttalabbai	Babji's father	
2016	Janatha Garage	Police Commissioner K. Chandra Shekar	
2016	Manalo Okkadu	Pratap	
2017	Om Namo Venkatesaya	Guru Anubhananda Swamy	
2017	Vaisakham		
2017	Jai Lava Kusa	Kaakha	
2017	Raja the Great	Surya Murthy	
2018	Naa Peru Surya	Mustafa	
2018	Subrahmanyapuram	Ayushmaan	
2018	Suvarna Sundari	Guna	
2019	Maharshi	Pallavi's father	
2021	Sreekaram	Ekambaram	
2021	Yuvarathnaa	Raghav Reddy (Education minister)	
2021	Ardha Shathabdham	Ramanna	
2021	SR Kalyanamandapam	Dharma	
2021	Raja Vikramarka	Chakravarthy	
2022	Gaalivaana	Komarraju	Web series
2022	S5 No Exit	CM Subrahmanyam Naidu	
2023	Suvarna Sundari		
2023	Sir	Pathi Papa Rao	
2023	Dasara	Thurpugutta Rajanna	
2023	Natho Nenu	Koteswara Rao	
2023	Jorugaa Husharugaa	Santhosh's father	
2024	RAM (Rapid Action Mission)	Riyaz Ahmad	
2024	Gangs of Godavari	Ratnakar's father	
2024	Mercy Killing	Ramakrishnam Raju	
2024	Committee Kurrollu	President Bujji	
2024	Saripodhaa Sanivaaram	Sankaram	
2024	Lucky Baskhar	CBI Officer Laxman Rao	
2024	Dhoom Dhaam	Ramaraju	
2024	Pranaya Godari	Pedda Kapu	
2024	Bachchala Malli		
2025	Sankranthiki Vasthunam	P. Manikya Rao	
2025	Court	Mohan Rao	
2025	Ari: My Name is Nobody	Vipra Narayana Paswan	
2025	K-Ramp	Krishna Abbavaram	
2025	12A Railway Colony	Rana Pratap	
2026	Band Melam	Sai	
2026	Suyodhana	Prakash	
2026	Bad Boy Karthik	Prakash	
2026	Irumudi	Guruswamy Goparaju	

==== Kannada ====
Year	Title	Role	Note
1992	Prema Sangama		
1993	Kumkuma Bhagya		
1994	Lockup Death	Kumar	
1994	Hettha Karulu		
1995	Mutthinantha Hendathi	Vinod	
1995	Thavaru Beegaru		
1995	Thaliya Sowbhagya		
1995	Puttmalli		
1995	Emergency		
1996	Hetthavaru		
1996	Circle Inspector	Allah Baksh	
1996	Saakida Gini		
1996	Sowbhagya Devathe		
1996	Mane Mane Ramayana		
1996	Aayudha		
1996	Police Story	Agni	
1997	Muddina Kanmani	Chandru	
1997	Agni IPS	Agni IPS	
1997	Police Bete		
1997	Central Jail		
1997	Dhairya		
1998	Jagadeeshwari		
1999	Underworld		
1999	Om Namah Shivaya		
2000	Naga Devathe		
2000	Mahatma		
2000	Ticket Tickets	Shiva	
2000	Paapigala Lokadalli		
2000	Durgada Huli		
2000	Independence Day		
2000	Khadga		
2001	Rashtra Geethe		
2001	Grama Devathe		
2002	Law and Order		
2003	Anka		
2003	Vijaya Dashami		
2004	Monda		
2004	The City		
2004	Srirampura Police Station		
2004	Bhagawan	Devudu	
2005	Mahasadhvi Mallamma		
2007	Police Story 2	Agni	
2007	Rakshaka		
2007	Sri Kshetra Kaivara Thathaiyya		
2008	Citizen	Bharat	
2012	Aa Marma		
2012	Kalpana	Kalpana	
2012	Samsaradalli Golmal		
2013	Brindavana	Madhu's Father	
2013	Angulimala	Angulimala	
2014	Rose	Jailer	
2015	RangiTaranga	Thenkabail Ravindra "Kalinga" Bhat	
2016	Raj Bahaddur		
2016	Mahaveera Machideva		
2016	Run Antony	Intelligence Journalist	Special appearance
2016	Madamakki	Shivashankar	
2016	Nagarahavu	Shivaiyya	
2016	Santhu Straight Forward		
2017	Real Police		
2017	Pataki	DGP Agni	
2017	Happy New Year	Venkatramana Bhat	
2017	Bharjari		
2017	Women's Day		
2018	Brihaspathi	Sudhir's father	
2018	Kismath	Lingaraju	Guest appearance
2019	Ibbaru BTech Students Journey		
2019	Yada Yada Hi Dharmasya	Maari	
2019	Bharaate	Ballala	
2021	Yuvarathnaa	Raghav Reddy	
2022	Avatara Purusha	Rama Joyeesa	
2022	Ombattane Dikku	Varadappa	
2022	Made in Bengaluru	Mohan Reddy	
2025	Dilmaar	Bhargav	
2026	Chowkidar	Prakash Gowda	
2026	Gharga	Gajanana Aithala	
2026	Bail	Ali	

==== Tamil ====
Year	Title	Role	Note
1991	Thaiyalkaran	Jayabal	
1992	Kaaval Geetham	Ramesh	
1998	Vaettiya Madichu Kattu	Madurai Muthupandi	
1999	Anthapuram	Prakash	
2000	Independence Day		
2006	Aathi	RDX	
2008	Thenavattu	Suryaprakash	
2008	Thiruvannamalai	MLA Poongundran	
2010	Kotti		
2010	Irumbukkottai Murattu Singam	Ulakkai	
2019	A1	Inspector Jayaraman	
2022	Anbarivu	Prakasham	
2023	Vaathi	Muthu Pandian	
2023	Bagheera	Inspector Sai Kumar	
2025	Diesel	Manoharan	

=== As dubbing artist ===
List of P. Sai Kumar film credits as dubbing artist
Actor	Titles	Notes
Suman	Tarangini	
Suman	Neti Bharatam	
Suman	Sitaara	
Suman	Merupu Dhadi	
Suman	America Alludu	
Suman	Bava Bavamaridi	
Suman	Athiradi Padai	
Rajasekhar	Aahuti	also dubbed for Tamil versions of his films
Rajasekhar	Ankusam	also dubbed for Tamil versions of his films
Rajasekhar	Magaadu	also dubbed for Tamil versions of his films
Rajasekhar	Aagraham	also dubbed for Tamil versions of his films
Rajasekhar	Allari Priyudu	also dubbed for Tamil versions of his films
Rajasekhar	Gangmaster	also dubbed for Tamil versions of his films
Rajasekhar	Aavesam	also dubbed for Tamil versions of his films
Rajasekhar	Omkaram	also dubbed for Tamil versions of his films
Rajasekhar	Subhakaryam	also dubbed for Tamil versions of his films
Rajasekhar	Evadaithe Nakenti	also dubbed for Tamil versions of his films
Rajasekhar	PSV Garuda Vega	also dubbed for Tamil versions of his films
Rajinikanth	Baashha	For Telugu versions
Rajinikanth	Pedarayudu	For Telugu versions
Rajinikanth	Veera	For Telugu versions
Rajinikanth	Nene Rajinikanth	For Telugu versions
Rajinikanth	Alludu	For Telugu versions
Rajinikanth	Tiger Shiva	For Telugu versions
Rajinikanth	Vijaya	For Telugu versions
Rajinikanth	Patnam Vachina Monagadu	For Telugu versions
Rajinikanth	Nam Annayya	For Kannada Version
Rajinikanth	Lal Salaam	For Telugu version
Manoj K. Jayan	Thirumalai; Souryam	
Amitabh Bachchan	Khuda Gawah	For Telugu dubbed version
Arjun Sarja	Singakottai	
Vijayakanth	Police Adhikari	For Telugu dubbed versions
Vijayakanth	Captain Prabhakaran	For Telugu dubbed versions
Vijayakanth	City Police	For Telugu dubbed versions
Vijayakanth	Raja Simha	For Telugu dubbed versions
Vijayakanth	Raghupathi IPS	For Telugu dubbed versions
Vijayakanth	Mathru Bhoomi	For Telugu dubbed versions
Vishnuvardhan	Sangathana	For Telugu dubbed versions
Suresh Gopi	Police Commissioner	For Telugu dubbed versions
Mammootty	Chief Minister	For Telugu dubbed versions
Mammootty	The King	For Telugu dubbed versions
Mammootty	Delhi Simham	For Telugu dubbed versions
Mohanlal	Yoddha	For Telugu and Tamil dubbed versions
Mohanlal	Abhimanyu	For Telugu and Tamil dubbed versions
Sathyaraj	Sastri	
Sarathkumar	Mande Suryudu	
Kabir Bedi	Hari Hara Veera Mallu	
Radha Ravi	Chamanthi	

=== As producer ===
- Garam
