= Nadodi Thendral =

1992 film by Bharathiraja

- DVD cover
- Directed by: Bharathiraja
- Written by: Sujatha (dialogues)
- Screenplay by: Bharathiraja
- Story by: Ilaiyaraaja
- Produced by: Bharathiraja
- Starring: Karthik; Ranjitha
- Cinematography: B. Kannan; Ilavarasu
- Edited by: P. Mohan Raj
- Music by: Ilaiyaraaja
- Production company: Manoj Creations
- Release date: 18 April 1992
- Running time: 140 minutes
- Country: India
- Language: Tamil

Nadodi Thendral (transl. The nomadic breeze) is a 1992 Indian Tamil-language historical romance film co-written, produced and directed by Bharathiraja and written by Sujatha. It stars Karthik, Ranjitha and Aurokripa. The music was provided by Ilaiyaraaja. The film, set in British Raj, is based on a love triangle between a goldsmith (Karthik), a gypsy woman (Ranjitha) and the district collector's sister (Aurokripa). It was released on 18 April 1992.

== Plot ==
The story is based on a love triangle between Thangarasu, Poonguruvi and Emily, an Englishwoman (District collector's daughter) during the British Raj. Thangarasu is a goldsmith's son, and Poonguruvi is a gypsy woman who has poultry. At the start they both collide and very soon fall for each other. Meanwhile, Thangarasu's bravery impresses Emily, the District Collector's sister's heart as well. The rest of the film deals with how the lovers unite with the help of Emily.

== Cast ==
- Karthik as Thangarasu
- Ranjitha as Poonguruvi
- Pandiyan as Poonguruvi's cousin
- Aurokripa as Emily
- Kavitha
- Vandhana
- Janagaraj
- Richard Reidy
- Napoleon

== Production ==
According to Sujatha, the film's story initially revolved around a collector's assassination, but Bharathiraja changed it into a triangular love story. The film is the debut of Ranjitha. Karikalan who debuted in Solaiyamma (1992) revealed he was supposed to portray Pandiyan's role and even ten scenes were shot with him including the song "Yaarum Vilayadum"; however due to some changes he was removed and replaced with Pandiyan. Although B. Kannan shot the film, his assistant Ilavarasu was also credited as one of the cinematographers. The art direction was handled by P. Krishnamoorthy.

== Soundtrack ==
The lyrics and music was composed by Ilaiyaraaja. This was the last collaboration between him and Bharathiraja until Modern Love Chennai in 2023. The song "All The Time" is predominantly in English.

Track listing
No.	Title	Singer(s)	Length
1.	"Oru Kanam Oru Yugamaga" (removed from the theatrical release)	Ilaiyaraaja, S. Janaki
2.	"Sandhana Marbilae"	Mano, S. Janaki
3.	"Yaarum Vilaiyaadum Thottam"	Mano, K. S. Chithra
4.	"Maniyae Manikuyilae"	Mano, S. Janaki
5.	"Yelamalai Kaatukulle"	Malaysia Vasudevan
6.	"All The Time"	Malgudi Subha

== Reception ==
N. Krishnaswamy of The Indian Express wrote it is "a love story that is simple without being superficial, commercial without losing sight of values, artistic without being obscure." C. R. K. of Kalki called Sujatha's dialogues, performances of star cast and music as positives and concluded saying when these add up, as the director says, it is not just an experiment but a poison test. Madras Musings wrote, "Fortyfive years after Independence, film-makers in India are beginning to look at British-Indian relations. But few look at them with any seriousness. To most of them it is exotica. As in Nadodi Thenral, just another "love" story. And like all love stories, this one is a fantasy – mainly in the mind of the filmmaker, Bharathiraja. No wonder it strikes many false notes". Ranjitha won the Cinema Express Award for Best New Face Actress.
