= Police Story 3 (2011 film) =

- Directed by: Thriller Manju; Sadhu Kokila; Anand P. Raju; J. G. Krishna; Vasu; Shankar
- Screenplay by: Thriller Manju
- Story by: Shankar
- Produced by: Shivananda Madashetty
- Starring: Thriller Manju; Sathya Prakash; Trishul Omkar; Arun
- Cinematography: Gauri Venkatesh; M R Seenu; J G Krishna; Janardhan Babu; Krishna Kumar; K Anand
- Edited by: B S Kemparaj
- Music by: Sagar S
- Release date: 8 July 2011
- Country: India
- Language: Kannada

Police Story 3 is a 2011 Indian Kannada language action film directed by 6 directors including Thriller Manju and Sadhu Kokila, who star in the film alongside Sathya Prakash and newcomers Trishul Omkar and Arun. Sudeepa makes a cameo appearance. The music was composed by noted music composer Sagar S. The film made its way to the Guinness World Records and the Limca Book of Records by shooting a normal two-and-a-half-hour movie in just 12 hours with the first copy of the film ready in 10 days after the shooting. It is produced under the banner of Aditya Creations. Shivananda Madashetty is the producer of this film. However, the team confirmed that the movie is not a sequel of the previous films Police Story and Police Story 2.

== Cast ==
- Thriller Manju as Inspector Vijay
- Sathya Prakash as MK
- Trishul Omkar as Prathap
- Arun as Raj
- Sudeepa as Surya (cameo appearance)
- Sadhu Kokila
- Shravanth
- Sandeep
- Neha Patil
- Disha Poovaiah
- Bullet Prakash
- Michael Madhu
- R. G. Vijayasarathy

== Production ==
The film was started shooting at 6.00am on 6 June 2011 and finished shooting the whole film on the same day at 6.00pm. The film has been shot in and around the Bangalore Palace Grounds.

== Soundtrack ==
The music is composed by experienced and noted music director Sagar S. who wrote two songs, composed and orchestrated all the songs in two days as revealed in the press meet. There are 3 songs in the film. There are two melody songs out of which one song is a romantic duet and another being a female pathos version of the romantic song. There is also a fast track song in the film. "Manassina Kavyada" is the song penned by composer Praveen D. Rao (Of the English film Stumble fame).

Song	Lyrics	Singer(s)
"Ninna Kannanchina"	Sagar S.	Vyasaraj, Rithisha Padmanabh
"Banna Banna"	Sagar S.	Vani Harikrishna, Vasu Dixit
"Manassina Kavyada"	Praveen D. Rao	Snehaja Praveen

== Reception ==
=== Critical response ===
Shreyas Nag from Deccan Herald wrote "Sudeep does a cameo in the movie donning the police attire. His character ‘Suriya’ emphasises the competence of the Karnataka police force. Various directorial techniques have been put to test with each director filming bits and parts of the two hour movie.The hurry to complete the movie is evident in the second half resulting in mismatch of scenes". A critic from News18 India wrote "Cinematography is disappointing as a lot of shots seem to be out of focus. Sudeep's sequences though are well shot. 'Police Story-3' is much weaker than its two prequels. Nevertheless, its filming and release within only a few days might fetch it a name in record books". A critic from DNA wrote "Thriller Manju seems rather lackadaisical as the tough cop. It is only Sudeep in his special appearance who ends up as the saving grace of the film. Alas, even that seems to last just for a few minutes. Skip this one, for it seems like a jigsaw puzzle that leads you nowhere".
