= Rasika (film) =

1994 Indian Kannada-language film

- VCD cover
- Directed by: Dwarakish
- Written by: B. A. Madhu [Dialogues]
- Screenplay by: Dwarakish
- Story by: P. Vasu
- Based on: Senthamizh Paattu by P. Vasu
- Produced by: Rockline Venkatesh
- Starring: V. Ravichandran; Bhanupriya; Shruti
- Cinematography: G. S. V. Seetharam
- Edited by: Suresh Urs
- Music by: Hamsalekha
- Production company: Rajadurga Productions
- Release date: June 3, 1994
- Running time: 116 minutes
- Country: India
- Language: Kannada

Rasika is a 1994 Indian Kannada language romantic drama film written and directed by Dwarakish and produced by Rockline Venkatesh. The film stars V. Ravichandran along with Bhanupriya and Shruti among others. It is a remake of the Tamil movie Senthamizh Pattu directed by P. Vasu.

== Plot ==
Ravichandran lives in village with his mother as a milk vendor with many cows continues...

== Cast ==
- V. Ravichandran as Krishna
- Bhanupriya as Rekha
- Shruti as Rukmini, Lakkanna's Sister
- Jayanthi as Yashodha, Krishna's Mother
- Dwarakish as Lakkanna
- Puneet Issar as Rajagopal
- Rockline Venkatesh as Rajeev
- Sunil Puranik

== Soundtrack ==
The music was composed and lyrics were written by Hamsalekha. All the seven tracks composed for the film became popular with "Ambaraveri" and "Haadondu Haadabeku" being received well.

Track listing
No.	Title	Lyrics	Singer(s)	Length
1.	"Thananam Thananam"	Hamsalekha	S. P. Balasubrahmanyam, K. S. Chithra
2.	"Chitapata Chitapata"	Hamsalekha	S. P. Balasubrahmanyam, S. Janaki
3.	"Haadondu Haadabeku"	Hamsalekha	S. P. Balasubrahmanyam
4.	"Yavvo Yaako Maige"	Hamsalekha	S. P. Balasubrahmanyam, S. Janaki
5.	"Baare Hogona Preethi Madona"	Hamsalekha	S. P. Balasubrahmanyam, K. S. Chithra
6.	"Haadondu Haadabeku"	Hamsalekha	K. S. Chithra
7.	"Ambaraveri Ambaraveri"	Hamsalekha	S. P. Balasubrahmanyam
