= Independence Day (2000 film) =

- CD cover in Kannada
- Directed by: A. R. Ramesh
- Written by: E. Ramdoss (Tamil dialogues); S. S. David (Kannada dialogues)
- Screenplay by: A. R. Ramesh
- Produced by: Madhusudhana Reddy
- Starring: Sai Kumar; Arun Pandian; Roja; Ranjitha
- Cinematography: A. Ramesh Kumar
- Edited by: M Saikumar
- Music by: Deva
- Production company: Saraswathi Film Division
- Release date: 15 August 2000
- Running time: 125 minutes
- Country: India
- Languages: Kannada; Tamil

Independence Day is a 2000 Indian action drama film shot in Tamil and Kannada languages, directed by A. R. Ramesh. The film stars Sai Kumar, Arun Pandian, Roja and Ranjitha. Music for the film was composed by Deva. The film performed poorly at the box office.

== Cast ==
- Arun Pandian as SP Subhash IPS
- Sai Kumar
- Roja
- Ranjitha
- Anandaraj
- Satya Prakash as Police officer
- Chandrasekhar (Tamil)
- Pandu (Tamil)
- Rockline Venkatesh (Kannada)
- Mukhyamantri Chandru (Kannada)
- Vinaya Prasad
- Alphonsa
- Baby Jennifer
- Joe Simon (Kannada)

== Production ==
The film was launched in 1997 as a bilingual and progressed slowly through production, having a delayed release. A Telugu version was also considered in 1998, but the venture was later dubbed into the language.

== Soundtrack ==
The soundtrack was composed by Deva.

Kannada version

All lyrics are written by R. N. Jayagopal and S Keshava Murthy.

Kannada
No.	Title	Singer(s)	Length
1.	"College College"	K. S. Chithra
2.	"Kudi Meeseya Saradara"	Mano, Anuradha Sriram
3.	"Dilse Dilpar"	Anuradha Sriram
4.	"Namma Thaayi Mother India"	K. S. Chithra, Deepika, Swarnalatha

Tamil version

All lyrics are written by Vairamuthu.

Tamil
No.	Title	Singer(s)	Length
1.	"College College"	K. S. Chithra
2.	"Oh Manmatha"	Mano, Anuradha Sriram
3.	"Jil Jil Roja"	Anuradha Sriram
4.	"Udal Mannukku"	K. S. Chithra, Deepika, Swarnalatha

== Release ==
The film had a delayed release in Tamil and Kannada during August 2000, and performed poorly at the box office.
