= Rockline Venkatesh =

Indian actor and film producer

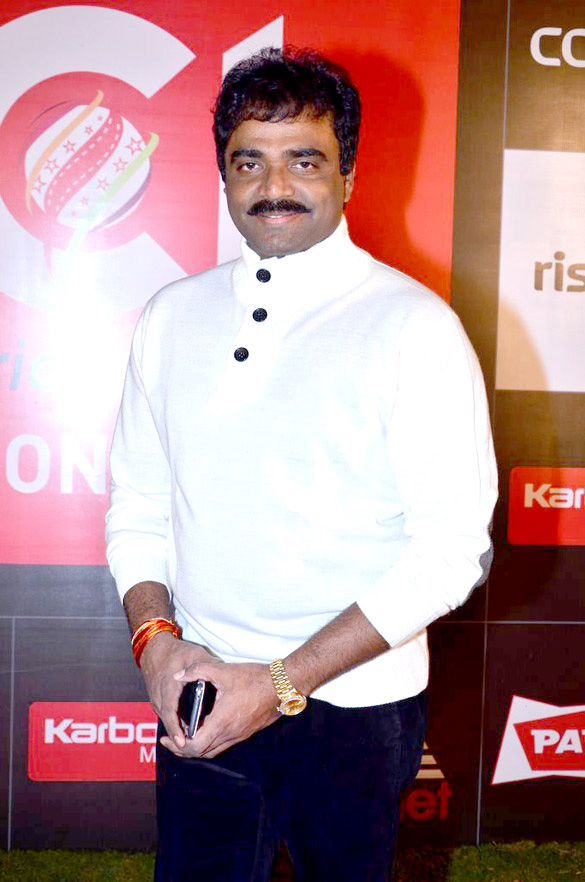
- Venkatesh in 2018
- Born: T. N. Venkatesh; 24 March 1963 (age 63); Chittoor, Andhra Pradesh, India
- Occupations: Film producer; Actor
- Years active: 1987–present
- Spouse: Pushpakumari
- Children: 2

Thirupathi Narasimhalunaidu Venkatesh (born 24 March 1963), better known by his stage name Rockline Venkatesh, is an Indian actor and film producer known for his works predominantly in Kannada films. He is the founder and owner of the production and distribution company, Rockline Entertainments which has directed over five films as of 2012. In 2015 he co-produced Bajrangi Bhaijaan which earned the National Film Award for Best Popular Film Providing Wholesome Entertainment at the 63rd National Film Awards.

== Career ==
=== 1987–2010 ===
Venkatesh began his career in films as a stuntman and playing supporting roles in 1987. In 1992, he produced his first television series, Ashawadigalu. He started his production venture in 1996 with co-production of Ayudha. He has made films with original stories and also remakes from other languages. He has made films with top super stars of Kannada film industry like Vishnuvardhan, Ambareesh, Ravichandran, Shivaraj Kumar, Upendra, Sudeep, Puneeth Rajkumar, Darshan, Vijay and others and also made a few small budget films. He has used top film directors like Ravichandran, S.V.Rajendra Singh Babu, D.Rajendra Babu, S. Narayan, KV Raju, Om Prakash Rao, MS Rajashekhar, Sadhu Kokila, Dayal Padmanabhan, Meher Ramesh and others. In 2009, When IDBI started financing Kannada films, Rockline Venkatesh one of the initial producers to welcome the bank to Industry. Rockline Productions has now become a brand name in the Kannada film industry which has produced several blockbusters like Preethse, Preethsodh Thappa, Yaare Neenu Cheluve, Ajay, Mourya, Diggajaru, and Dakota Express.

=== 2010 – present ===
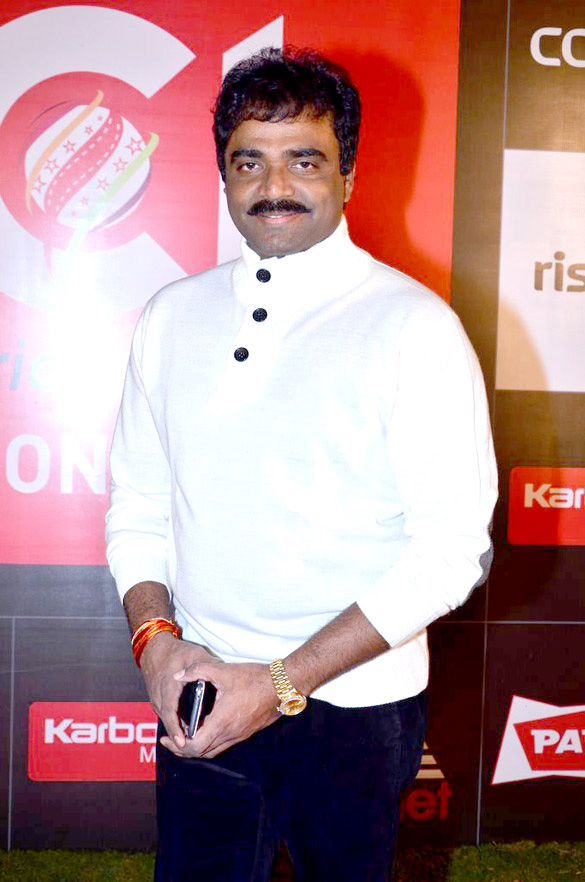
Venkatesh at the launch of Celebrity Cricket League 4

In 2010, The ongoing buzz was created when it was said superstar Upendra is directing a movie after 10 years, Rockline Venkatesh produced the movie and its said that they spend lakhs of money on photoshoot itself. Later it was mentioned that Rohit Shetty from Hindi film industry would direct the Hindi version of the film. Recently Venkatesh has been seen working with superstars from various industries, he made his debut as a Telugu film producer with 2014's Power, starring Ravi Teja, Lingaa starring Rajnikanth which released in various languages and in 2015 he associated with Bollywood's superstar Salman Khan for the film Bajrangi Bhaijaan which emerged as a commercial success grossing over ₹6.25 billion worldwide and in the process and became the third highest grossing Indian film after PK and Baahubali.

On New Year's Eve 2015, Killing Veerappan by Ram Gopal Varma was released. Rockline Venkatesh has keyed well in the prominent role as a police officer (where he has performed police roles in movies such as Agni IPS and Police Story) who becomes one of the victim to the killings of Veerappan.

In mid 2016 Rockline Venkatesh acquired the remake rights of Marathi blockbuster Sairat for four southern languages. Sairat, the critically acclaimed love story is the first Marathi film to gross over ₹100 crore (US$15 million) worldwide. Rinku Rajguru, heroine of the Marathi film Sairat will make Sandalwood debut with the Kannada version directed by S. Narayan.

In January 2017, Rockline Venkatesh's first Malayalam film was announced. The film, starring Mohanlal and Manju Warrier, was directed by B. Unnikrishnan while Tamil actor Vishal has been cast as the main villain.

== Filmography ==
Key
†	Denotes films that have not yet been released

=== As producer ===
==== Kannada films ====
Year	Title	Notes
1992	Belli Modagalu	Remake of Seetharamaiah Gari Manavaralu
1993	Ananda Jyothi	Based on the novel Maangalya Maale by Kakolu Saroja Rao
1994	Rasika	
1995	Himapatha	Based on the novel of same name by T. K. Rama Rao
1996	Aayudha	
1997	Agni IPS	
1997	Laali	Karnataka State Film Award for Second Best Film
1998	Kurubana Rani	Co-written by V. Vijayendra Prasad
1998	Yaare Neenu Cheluve	Remake of Kadhal Kottai
1998	Preethsod Thappa	Remake of Ninne Pelladata
1999	Naanu Nanna Hendthiru	Remake of Thaikulame Thaikulame
2000	Preethse	Remake of Darr
2000	Krishna Leele	Remake of Gokulathil Seethai
2001	Diggajaru	Remake of Natpukkaga
2001	Jodi	Remake of Darling Darling
2001	Usire	Remake of Bharathi Kannamma
2002	Dakota Express	Remake of Ee Parakkum Thalika
2002	Nagarahavu	Remake of Baazigar
2003	Ondagona Baa	Remake of Kalisundam Raa
2004	Maurya	Remake of Amma Nanna O Tamila Ammayi
2005	Varsha	Remake of Hitler
2006	Ajay	Remake of Okkadu
2006	Sirivantha	Remake of Aa Naluguru
2008	Bombaat	
2009	Yodha	Remake of Bose
2009	Junglee	
2009	Devru	Remake of Abhimanyu
2009	Manasaare	
2010	Super	
2012	Dakota Picture	Remake of Malamaal Weekly
2016	Kotigobba 2	
2016	Sundaranga Jaana	Remake of Bhale Bhale Magadivoy
2017	Manasu Mallige	Remake of Sairat
2018	Brihaspathi	Remake of Velaiilla Pattadhari
2019	Natasaarvabhowma	
2019	Aadi Lakshmi Puraana	
2023	Kaatera	
2024	Karataka Damanaka	

==== Other language films ====
Year	Title	Language	Notes
2003	Dum	Tamil	Remake of Appu
2005	Majaa	Tamil	Remake of Thommanum Makkalum
2014	Power	Telugu	
2014	Lingaa	Tamil	Cameo appearance in the song "Oh Nanba"
2015	Bajrangi Bhaijaan	Hindi	Similar to Kallarali Hoovagi; Written by V. Vijayendra Prasad
2016	Mudinja Ivana Pudi	Tamil	
2017	Villain	Malayalam	
2018	Aatagadharaa Siva	Telugu	Remake of Rama Rama Re...

=== As actor ===
Year	Film	Role	Notes
1989	Hongkongnalli Agent Amar		
1993	Ananda Jyothi		
1993	Anuragada Alegalu		
1994	Rasika	Rajeev	
1996	Police Story		
1997	Agni IPS	Baasha Khan	
2000	Independence Day		Kannada-Tamil film
2002	Dheera		
2002	Dakota Express	Krishna	
2002	Balarama	Balarama	
2002	Nagarahavu		
2007	Police Story 2	Vijay	
2008	Kaamannana Makkalu	Krishna	
2009	Devru		
2012	Dakota Picture	Krishna	
2013	Varadhanayaka	Police Officer	
2014	Lingaa	Man at the bar	Tamil film Cameo appearance in the song "Oh Nanba"
2016	Killing Veerappan	T. Harikrishna	
2016	Nataraja Service	Inspector Venkatesh	
2018	Naachiyaar	Feroz Khan	Tamil film
2018	8MM Bullet	KK	
2019	Kurukshetra	Shalya	
2026	Raktha Kashmira	Himself	Special appearance in the song "Star Star"
