= Police Academy =

Police Academy may refer to:

- Police academy, a training school for police recruits
  - Police Academy Hyderabad, national police academy in Hyderabad, India
- Police Academy (franchise), a 1984–1994 series of seven films
  - Police Academy (film), the first film in the Police Academy franchise
  - Police Academy 2: Their First Assignment, the second film in the Police Academy franchise
  - Police Academy 3: Back in Training, the third film in the Police Academy franchise
  - Police Academy 4: Citizens on Patrol, the fourth film in the Police Academy franchise
  - Police Academy 5: Assignment Miami Beach, the fifth film in the Police Academy franchise
  - Police Academy 6: City Under Siege, the sixth film in the Police Academy franchise
  - Police Academy: Mission to Moscow, the seventh film in the Police Academy franchise
    - Police Academy (TV series), a 1988–89 animated series
    - Police Academy: The Series, a 1997–98 live-action TV series
  - Police Academy Stunt Show, a theme park attraction
- Police Academy (album), a 1997 album by Strontium 90
- Al-Shorta SC, an Iraqi football club that once played under the name of Madaris Al-Shorta, meaning Police Schools

== See also ==
- University police
- College of Policing
- Police (disambiguation)
- Academy (disambiguation)
- Police Story (disambiguation)
