= Khaki Chokka =

- VCD cover
- Directed by: Vicky
- Written by: Vicky
- Starring: Sai Kumar; Nilambari
- Music by: Vandemataram Srinivas
- Release date: 29 June 2001
- Country: India
- Language: Telugu

Khaki Chokka (transl. Khaki shirt) is a 2001 Indian Telugu-language action drama film directed by Vicky and starring Sai Kumar and Nilambari.

== Cast ==
- Sai Kumar as Pratap
- Nilambari as Suma
- Thriller Manju as Balram
- Jayalakshmi
- Rallapalli
- P. J. Sharma
- Satya Prakash as Satya
- Jayaprakash Reddy as Janardhan
- Murali Mohan

== Soundtrack ==
The film features no songs and the score was composed by Vandemataram Srinivas.

== Reception ==
A critic from Idlebrain.com rated the film 3 1/4 out of 5 and wrote that "This film may not be a great film. But, it is going to cater to the needs of its target audiences. This film dishes out more than what you expect from a Sai Kumar's police oriented film". A critic from Sify wrote that "Saikumar is the only saving grace of this film. Unlike in his earlier films, Saikumar just throws his hands and legs around to a poor sound track". A critic from Telugucinema.com wrote that "Though it was made by a fight master except one fight all are routinue".
