= Kaaval Geetham =

- Title card
- Directed by: S. P. Muthuraman
- Written by: Vedham Pudhithu Kannan
- Produced by: K. S. Srinivasan; Sivaraman
- Starring: Vikram; Sithara
- Cinematography: T. S. Vinayagam
- Edited by: R. Vittal
- Music by: Ilaiyaraaja
- Production company: Vaasan Brothers
- Release date: 14 February 1992
- Running time: 124 minutes
- Country: India
- Language: Tamil

Kaaval Geetham (transl. The song of protection) is a 1992 Indian Tamil-language romantic action film directed by S. P. Muthuraman, starring Vikram and Sithara. The film was released on 14 February 1992.

== Plot ==
Priya is a crime journalist investigating the rape and murder of a victim whose face has been disfigured through acid. Inspector Ashok is assigned to the same jurisdiction. He saves Priya from the murderer's henchmen, arrests the murderer and begins courtship with Priya. One day Arthanari, a house husband, comes to Ashok suspecting that his neighbor Ramesh may have murdered his wife after a loud quarrel.

Priya and Ashok stumble upon a little girl who happens to be the daughter of Ramesh. Investigations reveal that the girl's mother Thangam was cheated by Ramesh in the village. Ramesh and his girlfriend Rathna successfully kills Thangam and tries to do the same to the little girl but gets saved by Ashok. As the criminal investigation proceeds, Ramesh slowly removes witnesses by various unscrupulous means. What transpires later forms the crux of the story.

== Cast ==
- Vikram as Inspector Ashok
- Sithara as Priya
- Baby Vichithra as Lakshmi
- Devisri as Thangam Ramesh
- Charle as David
- Chinni Jayanth as Arthanari
- Sai Kumar as Ramesh
- Disco Shanti as Rathna
- M. S. Bhaskar as Purse snatcher
- Shanmugasundaram as Police Inspector
- M.R.K. as Police Inspector
- Sethu Vinayagam as Nithyanandam
- Surekha as Purse owner
- Sudha as Emcee for Bharathi Nagar Maathar Sangam

== Production ==
In a 2013 interview, Vikram revealed that he signed the film, hoping that it would mark a comeback for the celebrated director S. P. Muthuraman.

== Soundtrack ==
The film had six songs composed by Ilaiyaraaja.

Song title	Singers	Lyrics	Length
"Enathu Thitta"	S. P. Balasubrahmanyam, S. Janaki	Vaali	4:48
"Ethanai Pera"	A. V. Ramanan, K. S. Chithra	Piraisoodan	4:29
"Kutrala Kaatru"	S. P. Balasubrahmanyam, S. Janaki	Vaali	4:45
"Sokkanukku Vaacha"	S. Janaki, S. P. Balasubrahmanyam	Vaali	4:49
"Thammara Thammaro"	S. P. Balasubrahmanyam, K. S. Chithra	Vaali	4:37
"Then Pothikai"	K. S. Chithra	Vaali	4:45
