= Papa The Great =

2000 film directed by K. Bhagyaraj

- Poster
- Directed by: K. Bhagyaraj
- Screenplay by: K. Bhagyaraj; Nawab Arzoo (dialogue)
- Based on: Vaettiya Madichu Kattu by K. Bhagyaraj
- Produced by: Gulshan Kumar
- Starring: Krishan Kumar; Nagma; Satya Prakash; Master Bobby
- Cinematography: K. S. Prakash Rao
- Music by: Nikhil–Vinay; Sajid–Wajid; Guest composers: M. M. Kreem; Naresh Sharma
- Production company: T-Series
- Release date: 28 July 2000
- Running time: 143 minutes
- Country: India
- Language: Hindi

Papa The Great is a 2000 Indian Hindi-language film directed by K. Bhagyaraj. Simultaneously shot alongside the Tamil film Vaettiya Madichu Kattu (1998), it stars Krishan Kumar, Nagma and Master Bobby. The film focuses on a meek man who lives a peaceful life with his wife and son. However, things contort after he witnesses a murder committed by a dreaded gangster. It was released on 28 July 2000 and failed commercially.

== Plot ==
Jai Prakash, an engineer, lives peacefully with his wife Pooja and son Sonu. The latter believes his father is a macho, but this is not true; Jai is meek, to the point that he would surrender rather than fight. But when Jai witnesses a murder committed by the dreaded gangster Raka, he must find the courage to testify in court.

== Cast ==
- Krishan Kumar as Jaiprakash
- Nagma as Pooja
- Satya Prakash as Raka
- Master Bobby as Sonu
- Satish Kaushik as Vikram Dahiya
- Laxmikant Berde as Mungerilal
- Mahavir Shah as Inspector Arvind Malhotra
- Anil Dhawan as a Inspector KK
- Shama Deshpande as Radha
- Shatrughan Sinha as Biharilal

== Production ==
Papa The Great is the Hindi version of director K. Bhagyaraj's own Tamil film Vaettiya Madichu Kattu (1998). It was produced by Gulshan Kumar of T-Series, and the screenplay was written by Bhagyaraj, while Nawab Arzoo wrote the dialogues. Cinematography was handled by K. S. Prakash Rao. Both versions were simultaneously shot in 1997 though the Hindi version was briefly stalled following the assassination of Gulshan Kumar. The final cut of the film was 143 minutes.

== Soundtrack ==
The soundtrack was composed by Nikhil–Vinay, except where noted.

All lyrics are written by Faaiz Anwar.

Track listing
No.	Title	Music	Singer(s)	Length
1.	"Papa The Great"		Udit Narayan, Aditya Narayan	6:00
2.	"Apni Si Lagti Hai"		Sonu Nigam	6:00
3.	"Husn Jawani"		Harbhajan Mann	5:02
4.	"O Rabba Mujhe"	Sajid–Wajid	Udit Narayan, Anuradha Paudwal	6:05
5.	"Mausam Badal Raha"	M. M. Kreem	Udit Narayan, Anuradha Paudwal	5:25
6.	"Bindiya Saji Nahin"		Udit Narayan	6:10
7.	"Aao Humse Pyar"	Sajid-Wajid	Kumar Sanu	5:05
8.	"Nagri Nagri"	Naresh Sharma	Vinod Rathod, Anuradha Paudwal	6:00
Total length:				45:47

== Release and reception ==
Papa The Great was released on 28 July 2000. Taran Adarsh wrote for Bollywood Hungama, "On the whole, [Papa The Great] lacks in qualities to have a safe ride at the box-office." On the contrary, K. N. Vijiyan of New Straits Times wrote that "IF you miss having good family stories in Hindi movies, this film is just for you". Made on a budget of ₹17,500,000 (equivalent to ₹72 million or US$750,000 in 2023), the film grossed ₹6,744,750 (US$70,000) worldwide, thus becoming a box-office bomb.
