= Vedham Pudhithu Kannan =

Indian writer and stage director (born 1950)

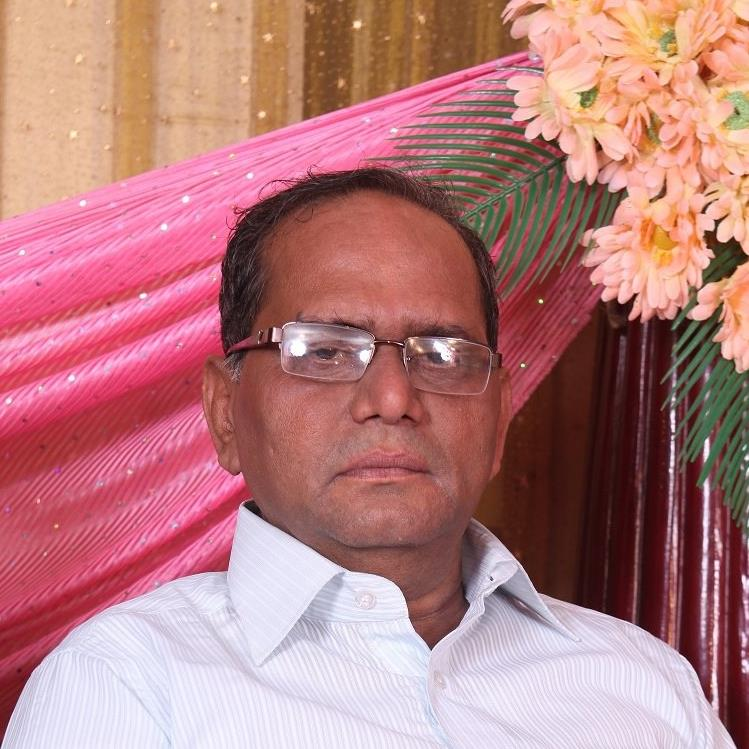
- Born: 18 April 1950 (age 76); Tirunelveli, Tamil Nadu, India
- Occupations: Film/Stage/TV writer, director, producer
- Years active: 1978–present
- Awards: Kalaimamani; Tamil Nadu State Film Award for Best Dialogue Writer

K. Kannan popularly known as Vedham Pudhithu Kannan, is an Indian film/stage director, writer and producer who primarily works in Tamil cinema. At various stages of his career, Kannan had the privilege to be mentored by veteran directors Bharathiraja, S.P.Muthuraman and K. Balachander. Kannan is known for his penchant for embedding social reform messages in his stories, and as of 2016 he had won Kalaimamani, Tamil Nadu State Film Award for Best Dialogue Writer, Mylapore academy award for lifetime achievement among others.

== Film career ==
Kannan began writing early, from his school years, having won in district level writing competitions. Subamuhurtham, directed by Raghu and produced under the banner of Indralayam paved the way to Kannan's entry into the Tamil film industry. His subsequent theatre drama, Jaathigal Illayadi Pappa was adopted into the film Vedham Pudhithu, directed by Bharathiraaja, for which Kannan penned the story and dialogue. After the success of this film, Kannan became popularly known as Vedham Pudhithu Kannan. Later projects like Siva, Pagalil Pournami (1990), and Kaaval Geetham (1992) established Kannan as a prominent writer in the Tamil film Industry. From then on, he had collaborated in vast story and film-making discussions for various films.

He returned to stage plays with his longtime friend, T.V Varadarajan's troupe, United Visuals and staged 10 plays in the next 7 years. With the growing popularity of TV soap operas in Tamil satellite channels, he switched his concentration to TV. He has penned TV serials like Nimmadhi ungal Choice II & III, Jannal (Marabu Kavithaigal) and Sahaana. He wrote the script for Anni (directed by Samuthirakani), Akka (Telugu) among others.

In 2006, Kannan became a producer under the banner Ezhuthupattarai, with his directorial debut Amirtham.

== Works ==
=== Stage dramas ===
Kannan wrote and directed these stage dramas:

- Ilavasa Inaippu aka Re(a)el Estate
- Mega Serial
- Take it Easy
- Iraval thanthavan ketkiran
- Subamuhurtha Pathrikkai
- Solladi Sivashakthi
- Avanudaiya Chellamma
- Magalir Mattum
- LKG Aasai
- Crorepathi
- Matrum Palar
- Veetukku Veedu Kaargil
- Aasikkum Aasthikkum
- Velicham
- Porkaalam
- Suya Tharisanam

=== Television ===
- Nimmadi Ungal Choice II (Kannamavin Kadhai) (directed by S.P.Muthuraman) – Story, Screenplay & Dialogue writer
- Nimmadi Ungal Choice III (Triveni Sangamam) (directed by S.P.Muthuraman) – Screenplay & Dialogue writer
- Akka (telugu) – Story & Dialogue Writer
- Jannal (Marabu Kavithaigal) – Story, Screenplay, Dialogue and Direction (title/credits shared with K. Balachander)
- Plastic Vizhuthugal – Story, Screenplay, Dialogue writer and Direction
- Vidiyal Puthithu – Story, Screenplay, Dialogue writer and Direction
- Sahaana – Dialogue Writer
- Anni – Main story & Dialogue Writer
- Vasantham – Story, Screenplay & Dialogue writer

=== Films ===
- Subha Muhurtham (1983) – Story and Dialogue writer
- Vedham Pudhithu (1987) – Story and Dialogue writer
- Siva (1989) – Dialogue writer
- Kaaval Geetham – Story and Dialogue writer
- Pagalil Pournami – Dialogue writer
- Devaraagam – Tamil dubbed dialogues writer
- Kasthuri Manjal – Dialogue writer
- Amirtham (2006) – Story, Screenplay, Dialogue and Direction
- Puthu Mugam (telefilm) – Story, Screenplay, Dialogue and Direction
