= Police Story (1996 film) =

1996 film by Thriller Manju

- VCD cover
- Directed by: Thriller Manju
- Written by: Thriller Manju; S. S. David (story)
- Produced by: G. H. Gurumurthy; N. Narasimha Murthy
- Starring: P. Sai Kumar; P. J. Sarma; Satya Prakash; Shobaraj; Avinash; Sudheer Babu; Raymond Desouza; Rockline Venkatesh
- Cinematography: J. G. Krishna
- Edited by: R. Janardhan
- Music by: Sadhu Kokila
- Production company: Gururaya Film Makers
- Distributed by: Gajula Nageswara Rao (Telugu)
- Release date: 16 August 1996
- Running time: 166 minutes
- Country: India
- Language: Kannada

Police Story is a 1996 Indian Kannada-language action film directed by Thriller Manju from a story written by S. S. David. It stars an ensemble cast featuring P. Sai Kumar, Shobaraj, Satya Prakash, Avinash, Girija Lokesh, Rockline Venkatesh, Sudheer Babu and Raymond D'Souza. The film was simultaneously dubbed into Telugu, Tamil, and in Hindi a year later. It was later was remade in Bengali Bangladesh as Khobor Ache in 1999.

The film's success led to the sequels: Police Story 2 (2007) and Police Story 3 (2011). A spiritual sequel, Agni IPS, was also released in 1997, causing it to create confusion with the Hindi dub title of the film among the northern audiences.

== Plot ==
Agni is a short-tempered cop who uses unconventional methods of punishing the gangsters, which the ministers later criticize. This leads Agni to resign from the job but later rejoins after being coaxed by his elder brother. A Mumbai-based CBI officer has been appointed to handle a case of a gangster named "Black Tiger". The senior official reveals a deceased gangster named Shobraj, who was responsible for the death of all the police officials after his wife was molested and killed by his nemesis.

Sathya and Dharma are two gangsters who terrorize Bangalore with their unlawful activities. Being a gangster in college, Dharma throws a girl off a building after she rejects his love. The student, who was in love with that girl, turns insane and becomes a witness, but is later killed by Sathya. With this, Agni clashes with Sathya and Dharma. The CBI officer gets killed by a corrupt minister, who is Sathya's right-hand man. Agni's brother also dies while trashing Black Tiger's henchman Black Cobra. It is later revealed that Shobraj is alive and is none other than Black Tiger.

The corrupt Inspector kills another Inspector to destroy evidence behind the CBI officer's death, who is killed after getting hit by a truck. To seek justice, Agni brings a mute youngster as a witness to this case, but Sathya shoots him in the court premises. Agni shoots Sathya and points his gun towards Dharma, who accepts his wrongdoings out of fear. It is revealed that the judge had killed the mute youngster in the hospital and the photos before the court hearing, where his photos were captured by a journalist. Towards the end, Agni arrests Black Tiger and his efforts have been appreciated by the CM.

== Cast ==
- Sai Kumar as Agni
- P. J. Sarma As Karnataka Chief Minister
- Satya Prakash as Sathya
- Sharath Lohitashwa as Dharma
- Shobaraj as Shobraj alias Black Tiger
- Avinash as ACP Surya, Agni's brother
- Sudheer
- Raymond De'Souza as Mumbai CBI Officer
- Rockline Venkatesh as Vijay, Agni's colleague and friend
- Sathyajith
- Ayyappa P. Sarma as Ranjith

== Production ==
Saikumar who gained recognition as a star with Lockup Death (1994) acted in this film under the direction of Thriller Manju, a stunt choreographer who made his directorial debut with this film. The Kannada and its dubbed Telugu version were successful and gained a breakthrough for Saikumar and it led to him being typecast in similar roles.

== Sequels ==
A sequel titled Police Story 2 saw Saikumar reprising his role which was released in 2007. The third unrelated film was released in 2011.
