= Police Stories =

2019 video game

- Developer: Mighty Morgan
- Publisher: HypeTrain Digital
- Director: Roman Sidorov
- Producer: Ivan Belousov
- Designers: Roman Sidorov; Ivan Belousov
- Programmers: Roman Sidorov; Alexey "LexPest" Mihailov
- Artists: Egor "jpega" Kuznetsov; Artyom Belov
- Writer: Andrey Sazhin
- Engine: GameMaker Studio
- Platforms: Linux; macOS; Nintendo Switch; Windows; PlayStation 4; Xbox One
- Release: Linux, macOS, Switch, Windows; September 19, 2019; PlayStation 4 September 1, 2020; Xbox One; July 9, 2021
- Genre: Top-down shooter
- Modes: Single-player, multiplayer

Police Stories is a 2019 top-down shooter video game developed by Mighty Morgan and published by HypeTrain Digital for Microsoft Windows, macOS, Linux, Nintendo Switch, PlayStation 4, and Xbox One. The game follows a pair of police officers who come upon a major conspiracy.

Development was financed through the crowd funding platform Kickstarter in June 2017. Police Stories was released for PC and Switch on September 19, 2019, PlayStation 4 on September 1, 2020, and Xbox One on July 9, 2021, to generally positive reviews.

== Gameplay ==
Police Stories is a top-down shooter action game with tactical shooter elements. The player controls a pair of patrol officers, John Rimes and Rick Jones, who are assigned to deal with resisting criminals. In singleplayer, the player directly controls Rimes while commanding Jones, while in co-op both are controlled by players.

Gameplay is similar to that of Hotline Miami, in which the player directly controls characters through combat in a top-down perspective, but with the tactical and strategic elements of Door Kickers and SWAT. The player controls Rimes supported by the computer-controlled Jones, and can command Jones to perform actions such as breaching doors, covering areas, arresting suspects, switching between holding position and following Rimes, or using equipment. Before each stage, the player can equip Rimes and Jones with firearms consisting of various handguns and long guns, and various tools and equipment including a lockpick, flashbangs, a medkit, and a ballistic shield, among many others, all of which have varying uses and effects (e.g. the borescope can be used to look through closed doors; the foregrip increases accuracy if a long gun is equipped; the smoke grenade creates a smoke screen that disorients enemies and hides the player's movement from them; etc.). Weapons and equipment are unlocked as the player progresses through the campaign.

In missions, the player is tasked with defeating a variety of criminals and differentiating them from unarmed suspects and civilians, as well as collecting evidence and, in some missions, rescuing hostages and defusing bombs. As the player is a police officer, gameplay centers around following a proto-use of force continuum and ideally apprehending enemies alive. The player can coerce enemies to surrender by shouting at them, hitting them with a melee attack, firing a warning shot, or using less-lethal weaponry such as pepper spray, tasers, and bean bag shotguns on them; lethal force is only authorized if the suspect is an active threat to the player or others, such as if they are holding a hostage at gunpoint or aiming a weapon at Rimes or Jones. In bomb defusal missions, the player can also use these coercion methods to interrogate detained enemies for information such as the bomb's disarming code. The player is awarded points for proper use of force, collecting evidence, and making arrests, while points are deducted for excessive force, missing objectives, and getting civilians or the officers hurt, promoting replayability to get the most optimal score, lowest casualties, and highest performance ranking.

Every new run, criminals, hostages, and evidence are placed randomly, and most elements are hidden by a fog of war effect when out of line of sight. Additionally, enemy behavior can change beyond what the player may expect; for instance, some characters ostensibly presented as harmless civilians in earlier missions may attempt to flee or even fight back in later missions. This adds to tension in gameplay and forces the player to act fast and make split-second decisions instead of relying on planning and supposed predictability.

Police Stories also features a level editor with Steam Workshop compatibility.

== Development ==
An alpha version was released through itch.io on June 6, 2017, featuring two levels. On July 2, Police Stories successfully raised $26,679 on Kickstarter with 555 backers. On December 12, a beta version was released for Kickstarter backers who pledged $30 or more, including two new levels, online co-op, and regular updates.

A large update for a closed beta version was released in July 2018 (still available for Kickstarter backers only), overhauling the equipment system and implementing new content such as commands in a row system and various gameplay improvements. By October the game was still under active development. Developers worked on visual effects, story mode, new equipment and pathfinding systems improvements. A new version of the open alpha was released on October 14 with new assets. On December 11, there was another update regarding the development process, confirming in-game controller support, couch co-op, and a macOS version.

In March 2019, the developers unveiled the Windows-exclusive level editor with Steam Workshop integration, and teased a Nintendo Switch port with couch co-op.

== Reception ==
On Metacritic, the PC version received positive reviews, and the Xbox One version received mixed reviews. Sin Vega of Rock Paper Shotgun called it "tense and fast, almost to a Hotline Miami degree".
