= Kailaasa =

Claimed micronation

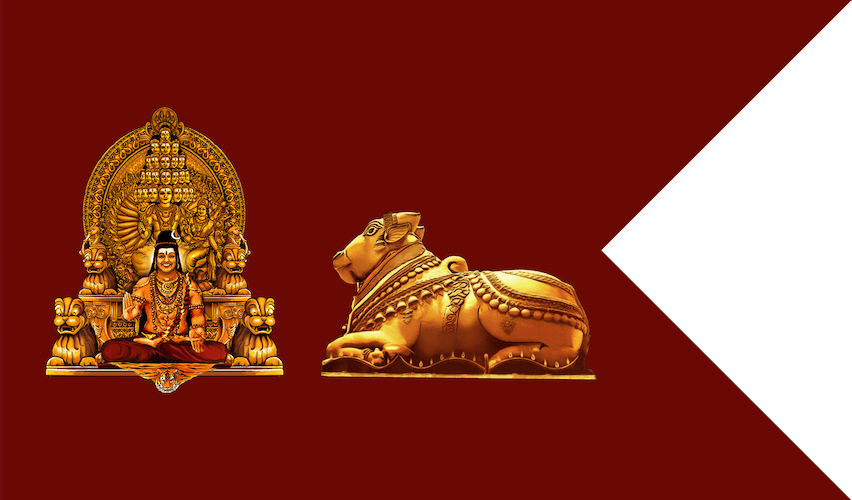
Flag of the claimed Hindu nation Kailaasa

Kailaasa, officially United States of Kailaasa (USK), is a non-existent micronation founded by Indian self-proclaimed godman Nithyananda in December 2019. Nithyananda, widely described as a cult-leader, claims that Kailaasa is the world's only sovereign Hindu nation.

Statements by purported representatives of Kailaasa have described it as "a borderless service-oriented nation". However, news reports suggest that it is located on "an island in Ecuador, near Trinidad and Tobago". Kailaasa's existence is not recognised by any government or intergovernmental organisation. However, representatives claiming to be from Kailaasa have repeatedly contacted various government bodies at the local, national and international level seeking recognition, often in the form of sister city arrangements, resulting in various scandals. Nithyananda's whereabouts are unknown, and a warrant for his arrest has been issued in India in relation to rape allegations.

== Background ==
Nithyananda (born Arunachalam Rajasekaran; 1 January 1978) is an Indian spiritual leader and a self-styled godman. He is the founder of Nithyananda Dhyanapeetam, a trust that owns temples, gurukulas, and ashrams in many countries. In 2002 (age 24), he began his public life under the name Nithyananda. He says that this name was given to him by Mahavatar Babaji in a mystical experience during his monastic wandering days in the Himalayas. In 2003, he started his ashram Dhyanapeetam in Bidadi near Bangalore, Karnataka. Over the following years, he would associate with the Florida-based Hindu University of America, Madurai Adheenam, and Mahanirvani Akhara. He has made various supernatural and pseudoscientific claims, particularly in relation to his own abilities, and has claimed to be an incarnation of Parashiva.

Nithyananda is widely described as a cult-leader. He has been the subject of several public controversies, including allegations of rape, which he denies. His whereabouts are unknown, and a court in Karnataka has issued a warrant for his arrest following failure to appear in court. He is the subject of a Discovery+ web series, My Daughter Joined a Cult.

== Timeline ==
=== 2019 ===
In December 2019, Nithyananda claimed that he had created a new "Hindu nation" microstate called Kailaasa (also known as Shrikailasa & United States of Kailaasa or USK) and claimed to issue passports, currency, and other documents. In his announcement he said, "Kailaasa is a nation without borders created by dispossessed Hindus around the world who lost the right to practice Hinduism authentically in their own countries". Nithyananda claims that Kailaasa is the world's only sovereign Hindu nation. Kailaasa has also been described as a network of non-governmental organisations spanning three continents.

A statement by someone identified as the press secretary of Kailaasa said that the country "was established much in the spirit of a country like the Sovereign Order of Malta, a borderless service-oriented nation", and that it "is operated through a group of NGOs from multiple countries", suggesting that it does not exist as geographical territory. By contrast, India Today reported that Nithyananda had bought an island "in Ecuador, near Trinidad and Tobago" for Kailaasa.

=== 2020 ===
In August 2020, Nithyananda announced the Reserve Bank of Kailaasa and released its official gold currency, the Kailashian dollar. He said the design of the coins was inspired by the currency of "the ancient 56 Hindu nations". He said that the bank would be structured on the lines of the Vatican Bank. In December 2020, Nithyananda announced that Kailaasa had begun issuing three-day visas for tourists. According to his announcement, visa-holders will have to travel from Australia aboard a newly launched private chartered-flight service, Garuda, and all visitors will be provided with food and accommodation during the course of their stay.

=== 2021 ===
On 19 April 2021, citing COVID-19 cases across the world, Nithyananda banned travel to Kailaasa from India, Brazil, Europe, and Malaysia. On 7 June 2021, media reported that while answering a disciple during a Amman reading, Nithyananda said that COVID would end when he is received in India with respect and performs pilgrimage to all Shakti Pitha.

=== 2022 ===
In August 2022, a representative for Nithyananda wrote to Sri Lankan President Ranil Wickremesinghe to request political asylum citing Nithyananda's ill-health. The letter contained an offer to invest in Sri Lanka on condition of asylum being granted and the donation of medical equipment required for treatment. The request demanded the establishment of political ties with Kailaasa so that an air ambulance would transport Nithyananda as a head of state.

=== 2023 ===
Nithyananda approached the United Nations again, through a woman identifying herself as Vijayapriya Nithyananda and claiming to be the "permanent ambassador" to the UN of his new country of Kailaasa, at 23 February 2023 open public meetings of the UN Committee on the Elimination of Discrimination against Women and Committee on Economic, Social and Cultural Rights, complaining in testimony and a written submission about persecution of "the people of Kailaasa", seeking international recognition for Kailaasa as the "first sovereign state for Hindus", and claiming Nithyanada to be the "supreme pontiff of Hinduism". The UN was reported to have ignored the Kailaasa submission as "irrelevant". In November 2023, the chief of staff of Paraguay's agricultural ministry was replaced after the government discovered that he had signed a memorandum of understanding with representatives of Kailaasa.

In 2023, Newark mayor Ras Baraka invited Kailasa to city hall to join in a "cultural trade agreement". City officials, including Baraka, took photos and signed documents to make Newark a sister city with Kailaasa. Newark City Hall called the scam a "regrettable incident," a council member referred to it as an "oversight," and Newark residents expressed embarrassment that city officials did not bother to perform a basic Google search to determine whether "Kailaasa" was a real country or city.

=== 2024 ===
Nithyananda visited the 6th United Nations Environment Assembly held in Nairobi during March, where a photo was taken of him with Ecuadorian environmental minister Sade Fritschi. In response to criticism, the ministry issued a statement declaring that the meeting was not planned, the delegates had approached Fritschi to exchange greetings, and that Kailaasa was not a recognized state.

=== 2025 ===
In March 2025, officials in Bolivia said they had arrested 20 people associated with Kailaasa. The officials accused those arrested of "land trafficking" after they negotiated 1,000-year leases with Indigenous groups for swathes of the Amazon rainforest. Those arrested were deported to their home countries, including India, the United States, Sweden, and China. They had started arriving in Bolivia in September 2024, offering various services such as free meditation sessions and promising food aid and herbal medicine. They aimed to use the provisions on Native Community Lands in Bolivia, which have increased autonomy for the Indigenous communities that live on them without interference from the Bolivian state, and created deals to lease and exploit nearly 500,000 hectares of land for a total cost under US$200,000, despite the fact that they are communal and cannot be legally transferred to others. Some of their delegates had been invited to the anniversary event of the Confederation of Indigenous Peoples of Bolivia, where they met with president Luis Arce. After the deals were revealed, the Indigenous communities involved expressed feelings of disappointment and betrayal against the representatives who had agreed to them, some of whom had apparently gone into hiding for fear of reprisal.
