= Satya Prakash (actor) =

Indian actor and director

- Born: Satya Prakash
- Occupations: Actor; director
- Years active: 1991–present

Satya Prakash is an Indian actor and director who works primarily in Telugu and Kannada-language films.

== Career ==
Satya Prakash has portrayed negative characters in over five hundred films across eleven languages. He made his directorial debut with Ullala Ullala (2020) starring his son Nataraj and Noorin Shereef.

== Filmography ==
=== Telugu films ===
Year	Title	Role	Notes
1991	Jaitra Yatra		
1995	Telugu Veera Levara	Johnson	
1995	Big Boss	Ramineedu	
1997	Pelli Chesukundam		
1997	Chinnabbayi		
1997	Master	Vikram	
1998	Snehithulu	Sirisha's uncle	
1999	Sultan	Terrorist	
1999	Seetharama Raju	Chinna	
1999	Jayam Manadera		
1999	Vishwa	Mahatma Guttedar	
1999	Krishna Babu		
2000	Okkadu Chalu	Minister Appala Naidu's son	
2001	Narasimha Naidu		
2001	Eduruleni Manishi		
2001	Ammo Bomma	Gangaram	
2001	Bhalevadivi Basu	Bhushan	
2001	Khaki Chokka	Satya	
2002	Seema Simham		
2002	Prudhvi Narayana		
2002	Vachina Vaadu Suryudu	District Collector	
2003	Zindabad	Satya	
2003	Sanchalanam	Mafia don	
2003	Dham	Satya	
2003	Donga Ramudu and Party		
2003	Seetayya		
2004	Yours Abhi	Gowri Shankar	
2004	143	Naxalite Leader	
2004	Sivaram		Dubbed in Hindi as Kasam Vardee Ki
2005	Danger	Raju Nayak	
2006	Pokiri	Narayana	
2006	Ashok		
2006	Lakshmi		
2007	Brahma – The Creator		
2007	Jagadam	Yadav	
2007	Chandrahas	Asad	
2007	Maisamma IPS		
2008	Victory		
2008	Deepavali	Rahman	
2009	Ek Niranjan	Police Inspector	
2010	Sadhyam		
2010	Namo Venkatesa		
2010	Dammunnodu		
2010	Ragada	Devendra	
2011	Mangala		
2011	Dongala Mutha		
2011	Nagaram Nidra Potunna Vela		
2011	Mayagadu		
2011	Kodi Punju		
2011	Bezawada		
2013	Shadow	Guru Bhai	
2014	Avatharam	Karkotakudu	
2014	Power	Feroz Bhai	
2015	Dhee Ante Dhee		
2016	Dictator	Saxena	
2016	Garam		
2016	Parvathipuram	Dumaketu Varman	Dubbed in Telugu again as Veera Khadgam (2023)
2016	Love K Run		
2016	Appatlo Okadundevadu	Purushottham	
2017	Neelimalai		
2017	Nene Raju Nene Mantri	MLA Choudappa	
2019	Samaram		
2019	90ML	Ramdas	
2019	Dhrusti		
2020	Ullala Ullala	—N/a	As director
2020	47 Days	Shafi	
2021	Senapathi		
2022	Kinnerasani		
2022	Masooda	Abdul Azeem	
2023	Suvarna Sundari		
2023	Bhari Taraganam		
2024	Anthima Theerpu		
2024	C202		
2024	Saripodhaa Sanivaaram	Seethayya	
2025	Sankranthiki Vasthunam	Billu Nayak	
2025	They Call Him OG	Pathan	
2025	Mithra Mandali	Freedom Raju	
2026	The Paradise	Bichu Singh	

=== Kannada films ===
Year	Film	Role	Notes
1996	Police Story	Sathya	
1996	Aayudha		
1997	Agni IPS	Kotwal	
1997	Central Jail	Acid Raja	
1997	Police Bete	"Bomb" Bhadra	
1997	Jackie Chan		
1997	Lady Commissioner		
1998	Yamalokadalli Veerappan	Veerappan	
1999	Vishwa	Mahatma Guttedar	
2000	Independence Day	Police officer	
2003	Vijayadashami		
2003	Shri Kalikamba	Mandiramoorthi	
2004	Srirampura Police Station		
2005	Kashi from Village		
2006	Ashoka		
2007	Lava Kusha		
2008	Heegu Unte		
2009	Yagna	Varadaraj	
2009	Machchaa	Bruce Lee	
2010	Nannavanu		
2011	Police Story 3	MK	
2011	Vishnu		
2012	Aa Marma		
2012	Paper Doni		
2013	Gajendra	Chakravarthy	
2016	Mahaveera Maachideva		
2019	Kempegowda 2	Police officer	
2023	Ghost	Jailer Thomas	

=== Tamil films ===
Year	Film	Role	Notes
1992	Meera	Henchman	Uncredited
1998	Vaettiya Madichu Kattu	Raaka	
1998	Golmaal	Ganesh's friend	
1999	Kaama		
2000	Kakkai Siraginilae	Gayatri's cousin	
2000	Independence Day	Police officer	
2001	Mitta Miraasu		
2003	Annai Kaligambal	Mandiramoorthi	
2005	Aadhikkam	Pandian	
2007	Manikanda		
2007	Cheena Thaana 001	Terrorist Satya	
2008	Vedha	Sathya	
2009	Adada Enna Azhagu		
2012	Maasi		
2016	Ilamai Oonjal		

=== Other language films ===
Year	Film	Role	Language	Notes	1991	Abhimanyu	Malayalam	1998	Seetha & Carole	English
2000	Papa the Great	Raka	Hindi							
2004	Humse Hai Zamana		Hindi							
2014	Meinu Ek Ladki Chaahiye		Hindi							
2008	Thrill		Malayalam							
2015	Nirahua Rickshawala 2		Bhojpuri							
2019	Raja	Tandav	Bhojpuri							
