= Gene Roddenberry filmography =

American Screenwriter and Producer

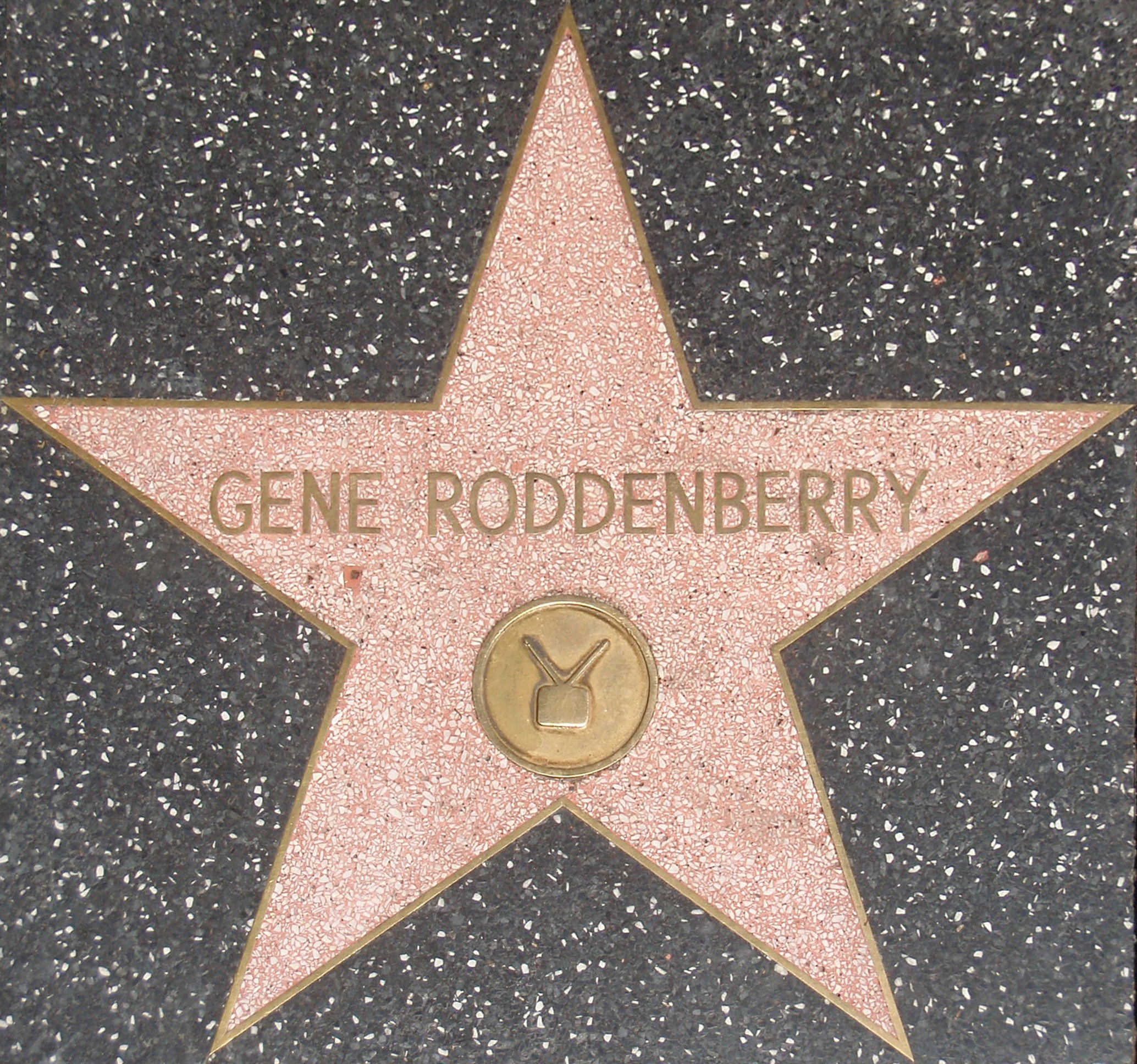
Roddenberry's star on the Hollywood Walk of Fame

Eugene Wesley "Gene" Roddenberry (August 19, 1921 – October 24, 1991) was an American screenwriter and producer of several television series, best known for his work in creating the Star Trek franchise. He began a writing career while he was a Sergeant in the Los Angeles Police Department (LAPD) and his first work to be bought by a network was The Secret Defense of 117, although it took four years to be broadcast. During that time, he wrote four episodes of the police procedural Highway Patrol under the pseudonym "Robert Wesley", as the LAPD required employees to seek formal permission to work a second job. After leaving the force, he wrote for several series, such as Have Gun – Will Travel but wanted to become a producer.

He wrote pilots for a series of his own, but these were turned down by the studios (except for a brief summer replacement series, Wrangler) until he began work on The Lieutenant. This ran for a single season on NBC on Saturday nights. While involved in that series, he began working on a science fiction premise that became Star Trek. He oversaw the production of the series for the first two seasons, but following budget cuts and the move to an unfavorable timeslot for the third season, he stepped back from working on Star Trek but remained credited as an executive producer. Following the cancellation of the series, he wrote and produced his first feature film, Pretty Maids All in a Row. He also produced several new science fiction pilots: Genesis II (also re-worked into a second pilot, called Planet Earth), The Questor Tapes and Spectre. Of these, Questor was approved to go to a full season, but following disagreements between Roddenberry and the studio over suggested changes, it was canceled.

Star Trek was resurrected twice, first as an animated series, and then as Star Trek: The Motion Picture. The studio brought in a new producer for the sequel to the film, to which Roddenberry demanded creative control or else he would refuse an executive producer credit, instead only willing to be credited as creative consultant. This credit started with Star Trek II: The Wrath of Khan and continued through to Star Trek VI: The Undiscovered Country. He took Star Trek back to television during the late 1980s, with Star Trek: The Next Generation Following his death in 1991, two of his 1970s science fiction ideas were re-worked, resulting in Earth: Final Conflict and Andromeda.

== Films ==
Year	Title	Credited as			Notes	Ref.
Year	Title	Executive consultant	Producer	Writer	Notes	Ref.
1971	Pretty Maids All in a Row		Yes	Yes		
1979	Star Trek: The Motion Picture		Yes		Also uncredited wrote outline for film and wrote novelisation	
1982	Star Trek II: The Wrath of Khan	Yes				
1984	Star Trek III: The Search for Spock	Yes				
1986	Star Trek IV: The Voyage Home	Yes				
1989	Star Trek V: The Final Frontier	Yes				
1991	Star Trek VI: The Undiscovered Country	Yes			Posthumous release; dedicated in memory	

== Television ==
Year	Title	Credited as			Notes	Ref(s)
Year	Title	Writer	Producer	Creator	Notes	Ref(s)
1954–56	Highway Patrol	Yes			Five episodes (four as Robert Wesley)	
1954	Mr. District Attorney	Yes			Six episodes (as Robert Wesley)	
1956	I Led Three Lives	Yes			Two episodes (as Robert Wesley)	
1956	Dr. Christian	Yes			One episode	
1956	Natchez	Yes			Television film	
1956	The Secret Defense of 117	Yes			Broadcast as part of Chevron Hall of Stars; Also called The Secret Weapon of 117	
1956–57	The West Point Story	Yes			Eleven episodes	
1957	True Story	Yes			One episode	
1957	Kaiser Aluminum Hour	Yes			Episode: "So Short a Season"	
1957	The Jane Wyman Show	Yes			Episode "The Perfect Alibi"	
1957	Boots and Saddles	Yes			Four episodes	
1957–63	Have Gun – Will Travel	Yes			24 episodes	
1958	Harbor Command	Yes			One episode	
1958	Sam Houston	Yes		Yes	One episode (unsold pilot), also known as Warrior or The Man from Texas	
1958	Jefferson Drum	Yes			Four episodes	
1959	The Night Stick	Yes	Yes		One episode (unsold pilot), also known as The Big Walk	
1960	Alcoa Theatre	Yes	Yes		Episode "333 Montgomery"	
1960	Hotel de Paree	Yes			One episode	
1960	The DuPont Show with June Allyson	Yes			One episode	
1960	Wrangler	Yes	Yes	Yes		
1960	The Detectives	Yes			Two episodes	
1961	Whiplash	Yes			Four episodes	
1961	Target: The Corruptors!	Yes			One episode	
1961	Two Faces West	Yes			One episode	
1961	Shannon	Yes			Two episodes	
1962	Defiance County	Yes			One episode (unsold pilot), also known as Ty Cooper	
1962	Dr. Kildare	Yes			One episode	
1962	A.P.O. 923	Yes			One episode (unsold pilot)	
1962	GE True	Yes			One episode	
1962	Naked City	Yes			One episode	
1962	The Virginian	Yes			One episode, Roddenberry story, Howard Browne teleplay	
1963	The Lawbreakers	Yes			One episode	
1963–64	The Lieutenant	Yes	Yes	Yes	One season	
1965	The Long Hunt of April Savage		Yes		One episode (unsold pilot)	
1966–69	Star Trek	Yes	Yes	Yes	Three seasons	
1967	Police Story	Yes	Yes		One episode (unsold pilot)	
1971	Alias Smith and Jones	Yes			One episode, same story as The Virginian	
1973	Genesis II	Yes	Yes	Yes	Pilot/Television film	
1973–74	Star Trek: The Animated Series	Yes		Yes	Two seasons, also credited as executive consultant	
1974	Planet Earth	Yes	Yes	Yes	Pilot/Television film	
1974	The Questor Tapes	Yes	Yes	Yes	Pilot/Television film	
1977	Spectre	Yes	Yes	Yes	Pilot/Television film	
1987–94	Star Trek: The Next Generation (Note: The episode "Unification" was dedicated to Roddenberry following his death.)	Yes	Yes	Yes	Seven seasons Credited posthumously from midway through season five onwards	
1988	The Star Trek Saga: From One Generation to the Next		Yes		Television documentary film	
1991	Star Trek 25th Anniversary Special		Yes		Television documentary film	
1997–2002	Earth: Final Conflict	Yes		Yes	Credited posthumously Five seasons	
2000–05	Andromeda	Yes		Yes	Credited posthumously Five seasons	

== Sources ==
- Alexander, David (1995). Star Trek Creator: The Authorized Biography of Gene Roddenberry. New York: Roc. ISBN 0-451-45440-5.
- Engel, Joel (1994). Gene Roddenberry: The Myth and the Man Behind Star Trek. New York: Hyperion. ISBN 0-7868-6004-9.
- Parkin, Lance (2017). The Impossible Has Happened: The Life and Work of Gene Roddenberry, Creator of Star Trek. Aurum Press. ISBN 978-1-78131-447-0.
- Van Hise, James (1992). The Man Who Created Star Trek: Gene Roddenberry. Pioneer Books. ISBN 1-55698-318-2.
