= Agni IPS =

- Directed by: Anand P. Raju
- Written by: Ravi Srivatsa (Dialogues)
- Screenplay by: S. S. David
- Story by: R. Selvaraj
- Produced by: Rockline Venkatesh
- Starring: Saikumar; Ranjitha; B. Saroja Devi
- Cinematography: J. G. Krishna
- Edited by: R. Janardhan
- Music by: Ram Chakravarthy
- Production company: Rockline Productions
- Release date: 28 January 1997
- Running time: 132 minutes
- Country: India
- Language: Kannada

Agni IPS is a 1997 Indian Kannada-language action film directed by Anand P. Raju, written by R. Selvaraj on a screenplay by S.S. David and produced by Rockline Venkatesh. The film stars Saikumar and Ranjitha, with B. Saroja Devi playing a supporting role. The film has musical score by Ram Chakravarthy, and the cinematography was by J. G. Krishna.

== Plot ==
Agni is an honest but short-tempered cop, who clashes with Kotwal, a dangerous gangster. While clearing a riot created by Kotwal on the streets, Agni loses his friend Baasha Khan. Agni marries Sneha after being stalked and troubled by her. The three students Raghupathi, Raghava, and Rajaram, who are responsible for ruining the college, are arrested by Agni.

Kotwal and a corrupt politician create a lot of troubles in which Baasha Khan's mother gets killed, and Sneha suffers a miscarriage, which leads to divorcing Agni by blaming him for the mess. In the end, Sneha and the lawyer gets kidnapped, where Agni saves them and kills Kotwal.

== Cast ==
- Saikumar as Agni IPS
- Ranjitha as Sneha
- B. Saroja Devi
- Umashri as Baasha Khan's mother
- Satya Prakash as Kotwal
- Sudheer
- Mandeep Roy
- Shakti Prasad
- Lakshman Rao
- Param Gubbi
- Joe Simon
- Rockline Venkatesh as Baasha Khan
- Vasudev Rao
- B. Jayamma
- Rathnakar

== Soundtrack ==
The music was composed by Ram Chakravarthy, with lyrics by S. Keshavamurthy.

Track listing
No.	Title	Lyrics	Singer(s)	Length
1.	"Dushta Janara Damana"	S. Keshavamurthy	S. P. Balasubrahmanyam
2.	"Biddaitho"	S. Keshavamurthy	K. S. Chithra
3.	"Jeevana Veene Nudiside"	S. Keshavamurthy	K. S. Chithra
4.	"Lokamathe Pranayadathe"	S. Keshavamurthy	K. S. Chithra
5.	"Hedarale Madadigoskara"	S. Keshavamurthy	S. P. Balasubrahmanyam, K. S. Chithra
