= Police Story 2 (2007 film) =

- DVD cover
- Directed by: Thriller Manju
- Screenplay by: Thriller Manju
- Story by: S. S. David
- Produced by: G. H. Gurumurthy; N. Narasimha Murthy
- Starring: Sai Kumar; P. J. Sarma; Shobaraj; Rockline Venkatesh
- Cinematography: J. G. Krishna
- Edited by: R. Janardhan
- Music by: R. P. Patnaik
- Production company: Gururaya Film Makers
- Release date: 6 February 2007
- Running time: 166 minutes
- Country: India
- Language: Kannada

Police Story 2 is a 2007 Indian Kannada-language action film written and directed by Thriller Manju, and is the sequel of 1996 film Police Story. It stars Sai Kumar, who reprises his role as Agni IPS. The film was simultaneously dubbed into Telugu under the same name, with Saikumar's brother P. Ravi Shankar, dubbing for Shobaraj in the Telugu version.

== Plot ==
Agni gets Promoted as DCP. Agni and Vijay are good friend and the loyal cops, who faces stiff opposition from Godmother Thimmakka in their objective of a crime-free city. Thimmakka, who can make or break in Judiciary and politics faces severe jolt when her son is gunned down by Agni and Vijay for murder of call center girl Swetha. To bring bad image to police department, Thimmakka unites two underworld dons. One is Dharmaraj and another is Satyaprakash on a promise that they get prime positions.

Agni does not lose courage even though his colleagues in the department turn in favor of Thimmakka. He has the support of sincere Chief Minister. In his killing spree of anti social elements that is also reply to Thimmakka, Agni becomes a nightmare. At this time the political moves changes the seat of power. Thimmakka's right hand Dharmaraj becomes the CM, his beloved commissioner gets transfer order and Agni is at the receiving end. In the blood boiling situation, Agni uses his intelligence and kills Satyaprakash in Dharmaraj's residence in pretext for security reasons. Dharmaraj becomes confused about Agni's moves.

Meanwhile, Agni gets shocked that Black Tiger has arrived, where it is revealed that Black Tiger actually escaped from the death sentence (which is shown in the previous film) with the help of corrupt officials. Agni is assigned to investigate, where he finds three government officials interlinked in this case, and brings them to a safe place to produce them at the court, but they are killed by Black Tiger in an encounter. Agni also loses his trusted colleague and friend Vijay at this stage and becomes alone.

Meanwhile, Black Tiger sets bombs across various places and escapes to Bangkok. In one of the bomb blasts, Agni loses his mother. Enraged, Agni barges into Thimmakka's residence and kills her, where he forces Dharmaraj to reveal everything in the court. Agni receives permission to encounter Black Tiger and heads to Bangkok, where he manages to kill Black Tiger.

== Cast ==
- Saikumar as Agni
- Rockline Venkatesh as Vijay
- P. J. Sarma as Chief Minister
- Shanoor Sana as Godmother Thimmakka
- Shobaraj as Black Tiger
- Thalapathy Dinesh as Tiger Memon
- G. V. Sudhakar Naidu as Dharmaraj
- Ponnambalam
- Lambu Nagesh
- Karibasavaiah as Inspector Prathap
- Rami Reddy
- Raghu Babu
- Loknath as Commissioner

== Production ==
Police Story 2 is a sequel to 1996 film of same name. The film retained most of its actors and technicians from the original version. Saikumar said "When we decided to make a sequel, we wondered from where to begin. So we decided to extend the story to Rayalaseema."

== Critical reception ==
R. G. Vijayasarathy of IANS wrote, "Police Story Part II' looks every inch like the original in its narration, content, technical details and even the way the characters speak their dialogues. It is utterly crude with no space for sensibility and sensitivity." Sify wrote, "This is a power packed action extravaganza. A sequel to 'Police Story' released 10 years ago this film is updated in technology and is stylishly made. Thriller Manju has done a mind blowing job with eight action scenes and non stop punching dialogues from dialogue king Saikumar in the role of Agni is the redeeming feature of this film. This is a feast for the action lovers and those who love dialogue oriented films."
