= Godavari (disambiguation) =

The Godavari is a river in India.

Godavari may also refer to:

== Places ==
- East Godavari district, in Andhra Pradesh, India
- West Godavari district, in Andhra Pradesh, India
- Godavari District of British India, prior to its bifurcation into East and West districts in 1925

== Bridges ==
- Old Godavari Bridge or Havelock Bridge (1900–1997), a decommissioned bridge on the River Godavari in Rajahmundry, India
- Godavari Arch Bridge (opened 1997), a bowstring-girder bridge on the River Godavari in Rajahmundry, India
- Godavari Bridge (opened 1974), a truss bridge on the River Godavari in Rajahmundry, India

== Transportation ==
- Hyderabad–Visakhapatnam Godavari Express, a train of the South Central Railway that runs between Visakhapatnam and Hyderabad.
- Lokmanya Tilak Terminus–Manmad Godavari Express, a train of the Central Railway that runs between Mumbai and Manmad.
- Godavari-class frigate, a class of guided-missile frigates of the Indian Navy
- INS Godavari, several ships of the Indian Navy
- Godavari railway station, a railway station in Rajahmundry, East Godavari district, India

== Films ==
- Godavari (2006 film), a 2006 Indian film
- Godavari (2021 film), a 2021 Indian drama film

== See also ==
- Godawari (disambiguation)
- Godwari dialect, spoken in Rajasthan, India
