= Dharmavaram =

Dharmavaram may refer to these places in Andhra Pradesh, India:

- Dharmavaram, East Godavari district
- Dharmavaram, Guntur district
- Dharmavaram, Sri Sathya Sai district
  - Dharmavaram Municipality
  - Dharmavaram revenue division
  - Dharmavaram Assembly constituency
  - Dharmavaram Junction railway station
- Dharmavaram, Vizianagaram district
- Damavaram
