= Rajahmundry railway station =

Railway station in Andhra Pradesh

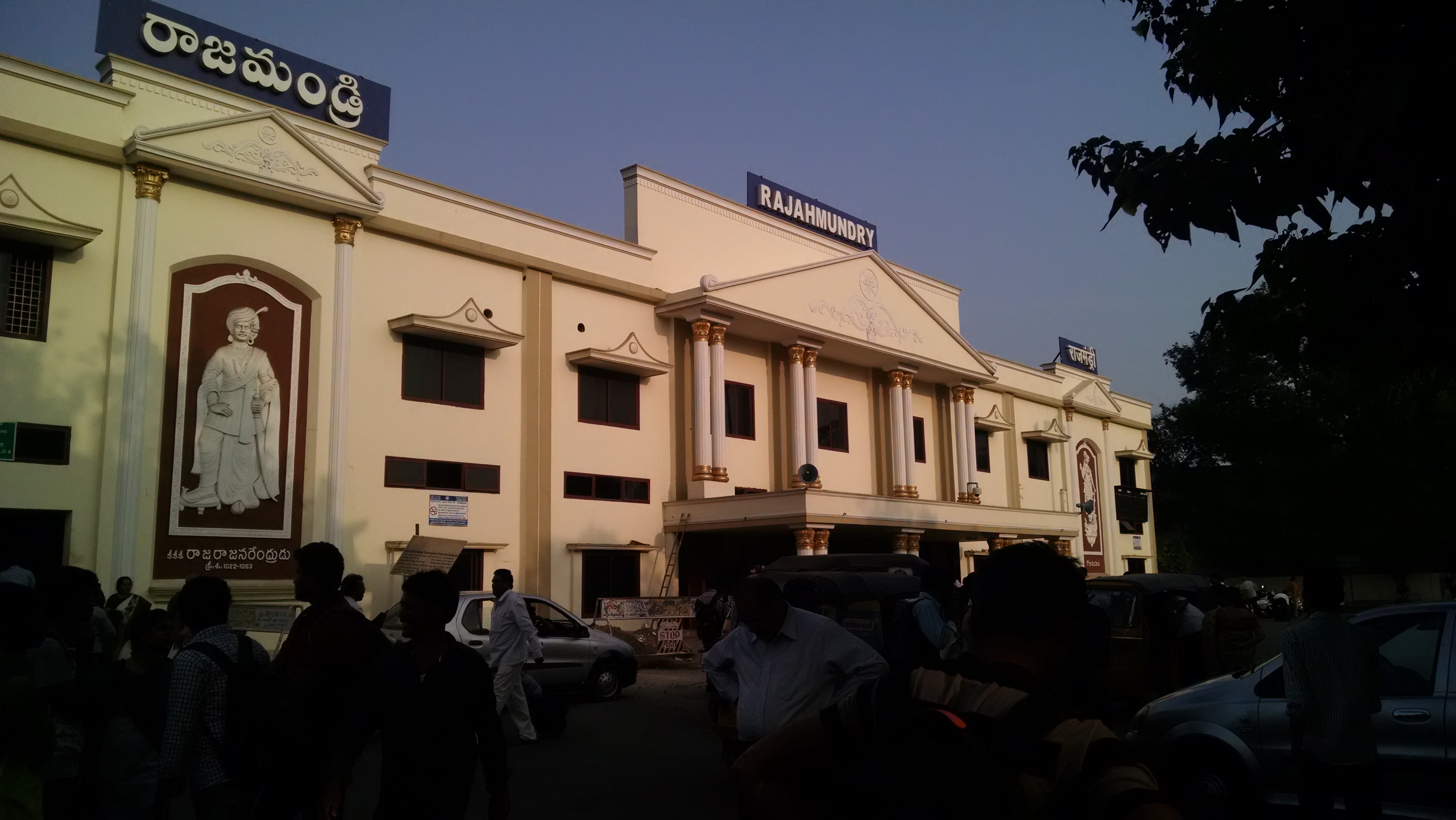

General information
- Location: Alcot Gardens, Rajamahendravaram, East Godavari District, 533101, Andhra Pradesh; India
- Coordinates: 16°59′04″N 81°47′04″E
- Elevation: 3.465 metres (11.37 ft)
- System: Indian Railways
- Owner: Government of India
- Operator: South Coast Railway zone of Indian Railways
- Line: Chennai–Howrah
- Platforms: 5 (6th platform under construction )
- Tracks: 10

Construction
- Parking: Available
- Accessible: Disabled access

Other information
- Status: Functioning
- Station code: RJY
- Zone(s): South Coast Railway zone
- Division(s): Vijayawada

History
- Opened: 1873; 153 years ago
- Rebuilt: 1959; 67 years ago (first); 1998; 28 years ago (second)

Passengers
- 530,000/day (250 trains (including all pairs of vande Bharat/ Amrit Bharat/ Uday Double Decker/ super fast express/ mail trains)/day)
Location

Rajahmundry Railway Station

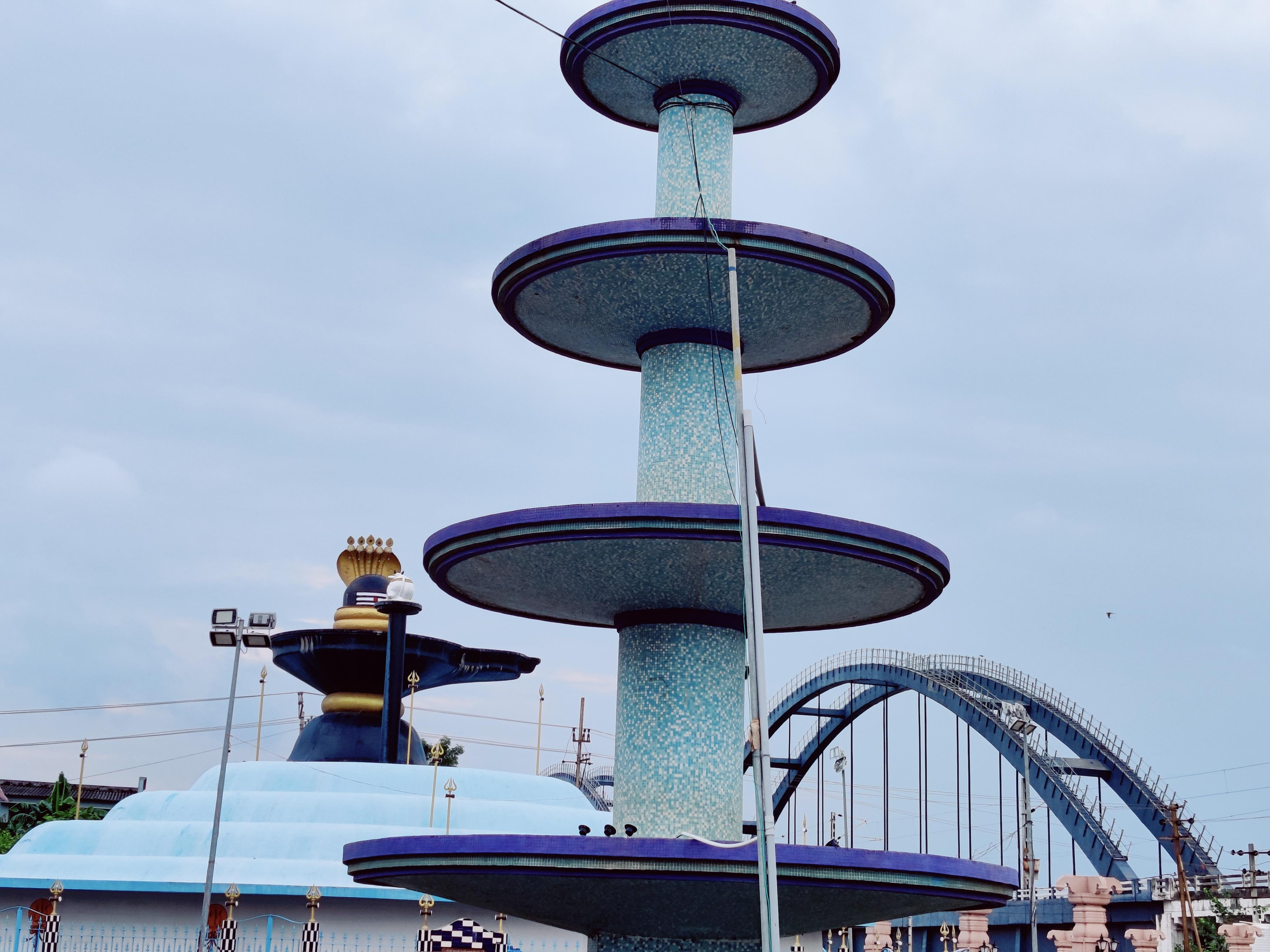
Iconic Godavari Arch Bridge, Rajahmundry

Rajahmundry railway station (station code: RJY) located in the Indian state of Andhra Pradesh, serves Rajamahendravaram in East Godavari district. It is administered under Vijayawada railway division of South Coast Railway zone. Rajahmundry railway station has computerized reservation facilities.

== History ==
The Godavari Dam Construction Railway was used for transporting materials for the construction of the Dowlaisweram Anicut at Rajahmundry around 1845. The project was completed in 1852 and the railway was closed down.

Between 1893 and 1896, 1,288 km (800 mi) of the East Coast State Railway, between Vijayawada and Cuttack was opened for traffic. The construction of the Old Godavari Bridge in 1897 and construction of the Vijayawada–Madras link in 1899 enabled the through running of trains. The southern part of the East Coast State Railway (from Waltair to Vijayawada) was taken over by Madras Railway in 1901.

== Classification ==
In terms of earnings and outward passengers handled, Rajahmundry is categorized as a Non-Suburban Grade-2 (NSG-2) railway station. Based on the re–categorization of Indian Railway stations for the period of 2017–18 and 2022–23, an NSG–2 category station earns between ₹100–₹500 crore and handles 10–20 million passengers.

== Structure and amenities ==
In 2013, ₹36 million (US$380,000) was spent on improving the amenities at the station. It is one of the 38 stations in the division to be equipped with Automatic Ticket Vending Machines (ATVMs). The station has roof top solar panels installed by the Indian railways, along with various railway stations and service buildings in the country, as a part of sourcing 500 MW solar energy. Elevators at platform 1&3. Escalators on 1&3: prepaid AC waiting hall & VIP lounge on platform.

== See also ==
- List of railway stations in India

Preceding station	Indian Railways	Following station
Kadiyam towards ?	South Central Railway zone Visakhapatnam–Vijayawada section via Godavari Bridge of Howrah–Chennai main line	Kovvur towards ?
Kadiyam towards ?	South Central Railway zone Visakhapatnam–Vijayawada section via Godavari Arch Bridge of Howrah–Chennai main line	Godavari towards ?
