= Kovvur railway station =

Railway station in Andhra Pradesh

Kovvur
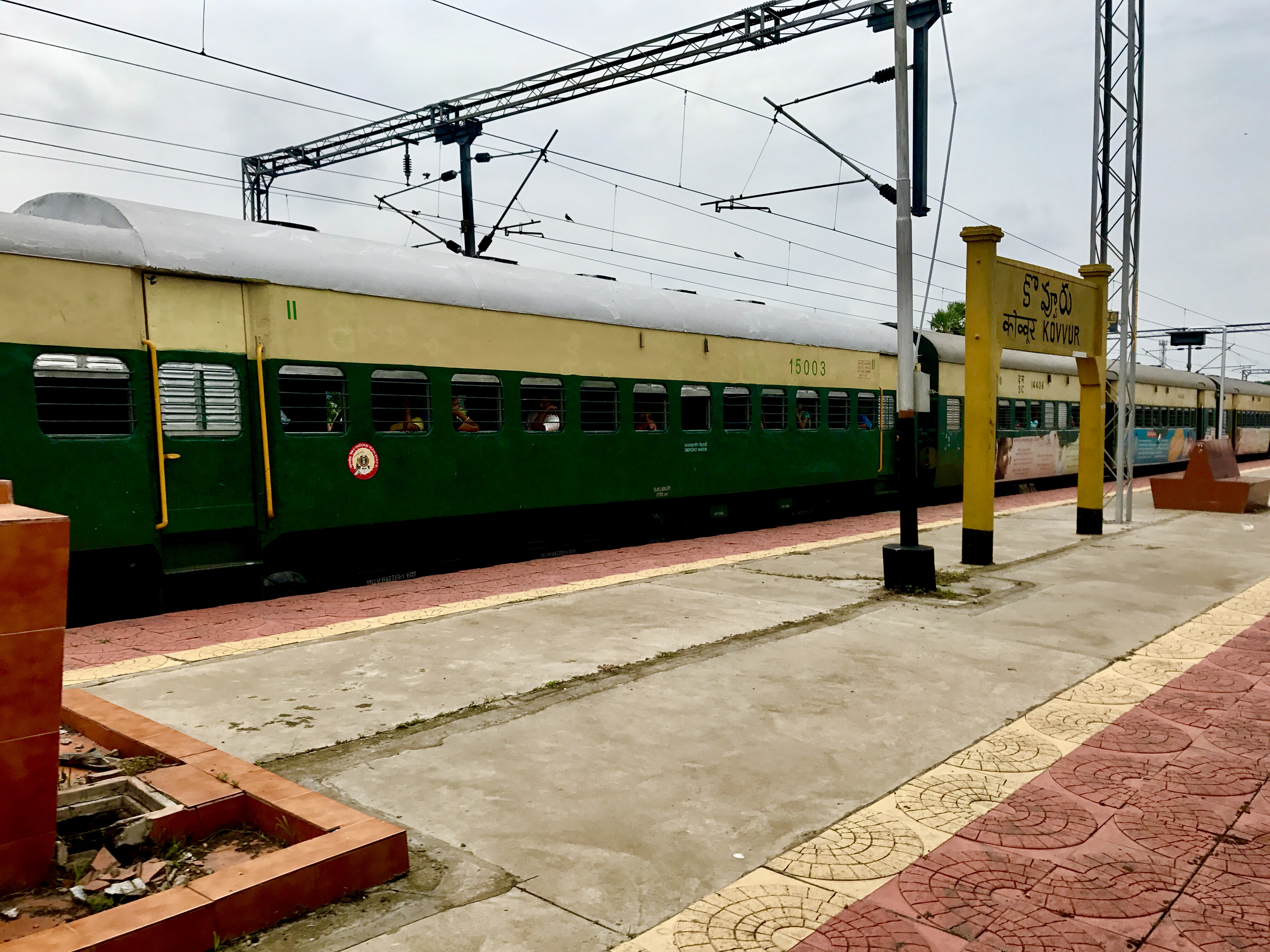
- Kovvur railway station signboard

General information
- Location: Kovvur, East Godavari district, Andhra Pradesh; India
- Coordinates: 17°00′25″N 81°43′35″E
- System: Indian Railways station
- Line: Visakhapatnam–Vijayawada section
- Platforms: 3

Construction
- Structure type: Standard (on ground station)

Other information
- Status: Active
- Station code: KVR
- Zone(s): South Central Railway
- Division(s): Vijayawada railway division

Services
Preceding station	Indian Railways	Following station
Godavari towards Visakhapatnam	Howrah–Chennai main line Visakhapatnam–Vijayawada section via Godavari Bridge	Terminus
Rajahmundry towards Visakhapatnam	Howrah–Chennai main line Visakhapatnam–Vijayawada section via Godavari Arch Bridge	Pasivedala towards Vijayawada
Location
- Location within Andhra Pradesh Location within India
- Interactive map

Kovvur railway station (station code:KVR), is located in the Indian state of Andhra Pradesh, which serves the town of Kovvur in East Godavari district. It is located on Howrah–Chennai main line and falls in the Vijayawada railway division of the South Central Railway.

== Classification ==
In terms of earnings and outward passengers handled, Kovvur is categorized as a Non-Suburban Grade-5 (NSG-5) railway station. Based on the re–categorization of Indian Railway stations for the period of 2017–18 and 2022–23, an NSG–5 category station earns between ₹1–₹10 crore and handles 1–2 million passengers.

== Station amenities ==
It is one of the 38 stations in the division to be equipped with Automatic Ticket Vending Machines (ATVMs).
