= Kovvur =

Kovvur Kovvuru, Govur
- Town
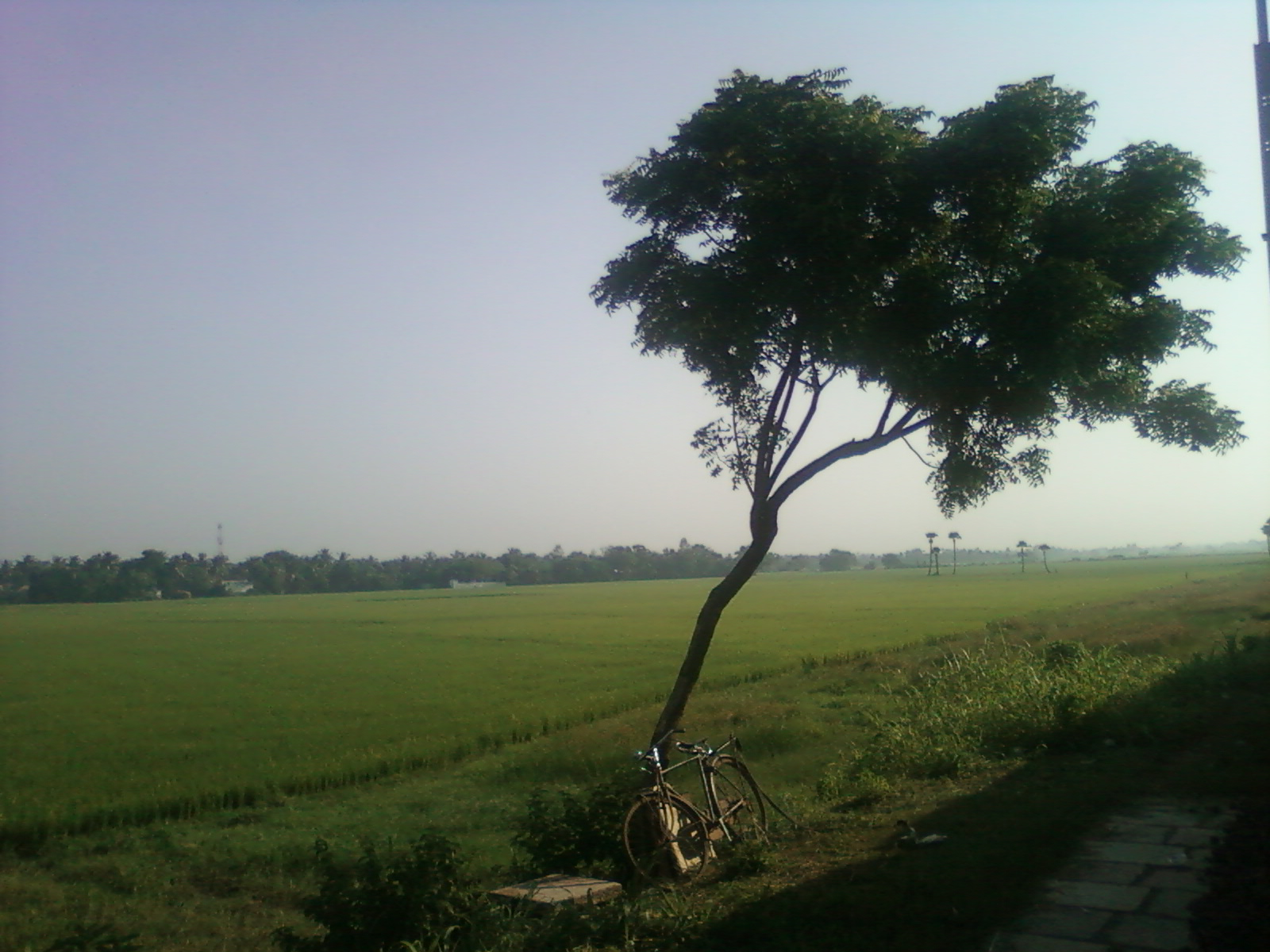
- View of paddy fields near Kovvur from train

- Location in Andhra Pradesh, India
- Coordinates: 17.017°N 81.731°E
- Country: India
- State: Andhra Pradesh
- District: East Godavari district
- Mandal: Kovvur

Government
  - Type: Municipal council
  - Body: Kovvur Municipality
  - MLA: Muppidi Venkateswara Rao (TDP)
  - MP: Daggubati Purandeswari

Area
  - Total: 24.56 km^{2} (9.48 sq mi)
- Elevation: 9 m (30 ft)

Population (2011)
  - Total: 39,667
  - Density: 1,615/km^{2} (4,183/sq mi)

Languages
  - Official: Telugu
- Time zone: UTC+5:30 (IST)
- PIN: 534 350
- Telephone code: +91–8813

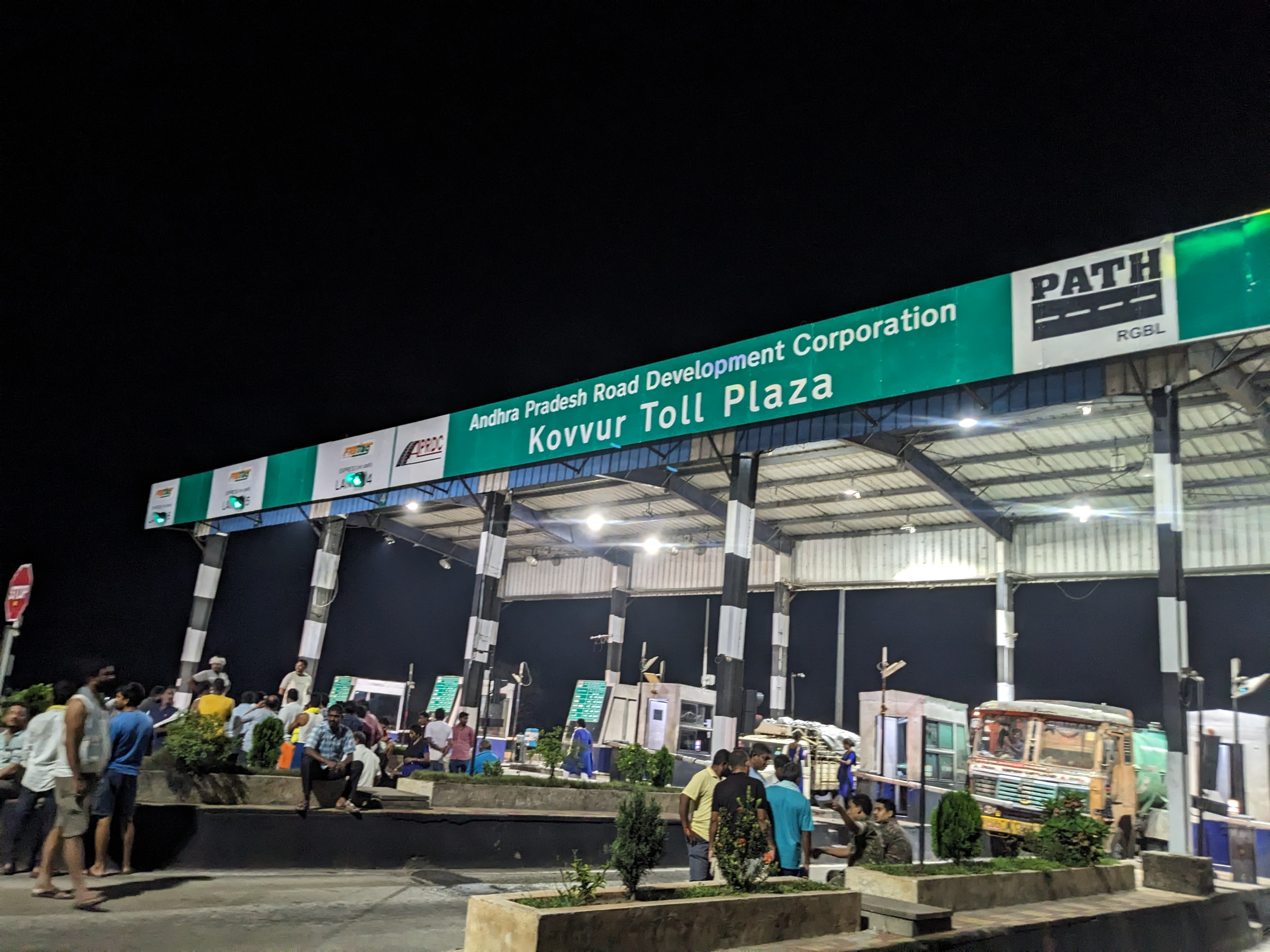
Kovvur Toll Plaza

Kovvur, also natively known as Kovvuru, is a town in the East Godavari district of the Indian state of Andhra Pradesh. It is a municipality and the mandal headquarters of Kovvur mandal in Kovvur revenue division.

== Etymology ==
This Town was earlier referred as Govur. According to Brahma Puranam, Kovvur(Govuru) is considered as the place of Gautama Maharishi's Ashramam. He did farming in the surrounding regions to maintain his Ashramam. Gautama Maharishi once he accidentally kills a cow, grazing in his paddy field, by throwing a darbha (sharp, pointed grass). Gautama becomes upset with this incident and offers a great tapas for Lord Shiva in Brahmagiri mountains. The god, pleased by his tapas, wipes away his sin and allows Ganga to flow in his farm to purify the place (Kovvur). The river thus originated is called "Godavari" which means "originated due to killing a cow". It is also called as "Gautami" in appreciation to the effort of the Maharishi in bringing Godavari to earth. Gautama Maharishi accidentally kills a cow in his farm and to clear out his sin, he offers a great tapas near Bhrahmagiri parvatas near Triambakam in Maharashtra. Lord Shiva pleased with his tapas allows Ganga to sanctify the region.

Kovvuru is a transformed name of Govuru which originated from the above story. The names of various places around Kovvuru highlight this fact. It is believed that Gautama established a Vijneswara temple in the South and a Kumaraswami temple in the North of his Ashrama. These are currently known as Vijjeswaram and Kumaradevam. The place where Gautama ploughed the farm was Arikirevula which is transformed to Arikirevu. Vadapalli, Munikoodali and Brahmanagudem were the places of rishis. The place where Ahalya lived was called Tougimi which is currently called Togummi. The place where the cow died was Chavugallu which is currently called Chagallu.

Kovvuru Goshpada Kshetram is a sacred place and a must visiting place during pushkaras.

== Geography ==
Kovvuru (Kovvur) is situated on the west bank of the Godavari River, at a distance of 10 km from the district headquarters, Rajahmundry. It is located at 17.0167°N 81.7333°E and has an average elevation of 10 m (33 ft). Kovvuru is the "Main Gate" of East Godavari Distt. and is very close to Rajahmundry City from the north coast of Andhra Pradesh. Kovvur is the most peaceful town in the district and a devotional town. Goshpada Kshetram is a very well known tourist place, where Godavari Pushkaralu takes place Every 12 years.

== Demographics ==
As of 2001 India census, Kovvur had a population of 39,193. Males constitute 50% of the population and females 50%. Kovvur has an average literacy rate of 70%, higher than the national average of 59.5%: male literacy is 74%, and female literacy is 66%. In Kovvur, 11% of the population is under 6 years of age.

== Governance ==
Civic administration

Kovvur municipality was formed in the year 1965. It is a Grade- 1 Municipality, which is spread over an area of 24.56 km^{2} (9.48 mi^{2}) and has 23 election wards.

== Transport ==
It is supported by bridges across Godavari River:

- Godavari Bridge which is the second longest railroad bridge in Asia;
- Godavari Arch Bridge was commissioned on 14 March 1997 for Howrah–Chennai main line.
- Old Godavari Bridge (Havelock Bridge) was the earliest of all, built in 1897 and decommissioned in 1997.

=== Roadways ===
The town has a total road length of 70.45 km (43.78 mi). The Andhra Pradesh State Road Transport Corporation (APSRTC) operates bus services from Kovvuru bus station.

=== Railways ===
Kovvur is one of the fourteen D–category stations in the Vijayawada railway division of South Central Railway zone. Kovvur will become a Potential Railway junction Between both Telugu States after the Completion of Kovvur-Bhadrachalam road Railway line.

=== Airways ===
Rajahmundry Airport is the nearest airport, located 15 km away.

== Education ==
The primary and secondary school education is imparted by government, aided, and private schools, under the School Education Department of the state. The medium of instruction followed by different schools are English, Telugu. There are many famous institutions like ABN&PRR College Of Sciences, Sanskrit colleges and many other private institutions.
