= Kovvur mandal =

- Mandal
- Interactive map of Kovvur mandal
- Location in Andhra Pradesh, India
- Country: India
- State: Andhra Pradesh
- District: East Goadavari
- Headquarters: Kovvur

Government
  - Body: Mandal Parishad

Population (2011)
  - Total: 108,445

Languages
  - Official: Telugu
- Time zone: UTC+5:30 (IST)

Kovvur mandal is one of the 19 mandals in East Godavari district of the Indian state of Andhra Pradesh. Its headquarters are located in the town of Kovvur. The mandal is bounded by Nidadavolu, Chagallu, Devarapalle, Tallapaudi mandals and on the east by the Godavari River.

== Demographics ==
As of 2011 Census of India, the mandal had a population of 108,445. The total population constitute, 53,392 males and 55,053 females —a sex ratio of 1031 females per 1000 males. 10,633 children are in the age group of 0–6 years, of which 5,312 are boys and 5,321 are girls. The effective literacy rate stands at 76.33% with 74,659 literates.

== Governance ==
Kovvur mandal is one of the 3 mandals under Kovvur (SC) (Assembly constituency), which in turn represents Rajahmundry (Lok Sabha constituency) of Andhra Pradesh.

== Towns and villages ==
As of 2011 census, the mandal has 17 settlements. It includes 1 town and 16 villages. Kovvur (M) is the only town in the mandal.

The settlements in the mandal are listed below:

1. Arikirevula
2. Chigurulanka
3. Chilipi
4. Decherla
5. Dharmavaram
6. Dommeru
7. Kapavaram
8. Isukapatlapangidi
9. Kovvur (M)(†)
10. Kumaradevam
11. Madduru
12. Maddurulank
13. Nandamuru
14. Pasivedala
15. Penakanametta
16. Thogummi
17. Vadapalle
18. Vemuluru

Note: M-Municipality, †–Mandal headquarters

== See also ==
- List of mandals in Andhra Pradesh
