= Thogummi =

- Village
- Interactive map of Thogummi
- Location in Andhra Pradesh, India
- Coordinates: 17.0333°N 81.7052°E
- Country: India
- State: Andhra Pradesh
- District: East Godavari
- Mandal: Kovvur

Languages
  - Official: Telugu
- Time zone: UTC+5:30 (IST)
- PIN: 534350
- Lok Sabha constituency: Rajahmundry
- Primary Health Care: 9347514390

Thogummi is a village in East Godavari district of the Indian state of Andhra Pradesh. It is located in Kovvur mandal.
