= BBR Construction =

Swiss builder of stay cable bridges

BBR Construction, BBR System, Bureau BBR, BBR Group or BBR VT International is a Swiss construction firm specializing in cable construction projects such as suspension bridges and tramways. They built the first carbon fibre stay cable bridge. The firm was started in 1944 by three engineers, Max Birkenmaier, Antonio Brandestini and Mirko Robin Ros. Their stay cable technology has been applied to over 400 major structures around the world.

Among their projects have been:

- 1961 the Schiller Street Bridge in Stuttgart, Germany, span 61 meters, a curved, stay cable bridge for pedestrians
- 1991 the Gilly Bridge over the Isere River in Albertville, France, longest span 102 meters, a stay cable bridge with a single tower
- 1996 the Storchenbrücke bridge in Winterthur, Switzerland, main span 63 meters, the world's first carbon fibre stay cables bridge
- 1997 the Godavari Arch Bridge over the Godavari River in Rajahmundry, India, Asia's second longest railroad bridge.
- 2012 The Ada Bridge over the Sava river in Belgrade, Serbia.
