= Dommeru =

- village
- Interactive map of Dommeru
- Location within Andhra Pradesh
- Coordinates: 17°1′51″N 81°41′10″E
- Country: India
- State: Andhra Pradesh
- District: East Godavari
- Mandal: Kovvur

Population
  - Total: 13,959
- Time zone: UTC+5:30 (IST)
- Postal Index Number: 534351

Dommeru is a village in East Godavari district of the Indian state of Andhra Pradesh. It is located in Kovvur mandal.

== Demographics ==
As of 2011 Census of India, Dommeru had a population of 13000. The total population constitute, 6455 males and 6545 females with a sex ratio of 1014 females per 1000 males. 1208 children are in the age group of 0–6 years, with sex ratio of 1003. The average literacy rate stands at 74.78%.
