= Godavari railway station =

Railway station in Andhra Pradesh

Godavari
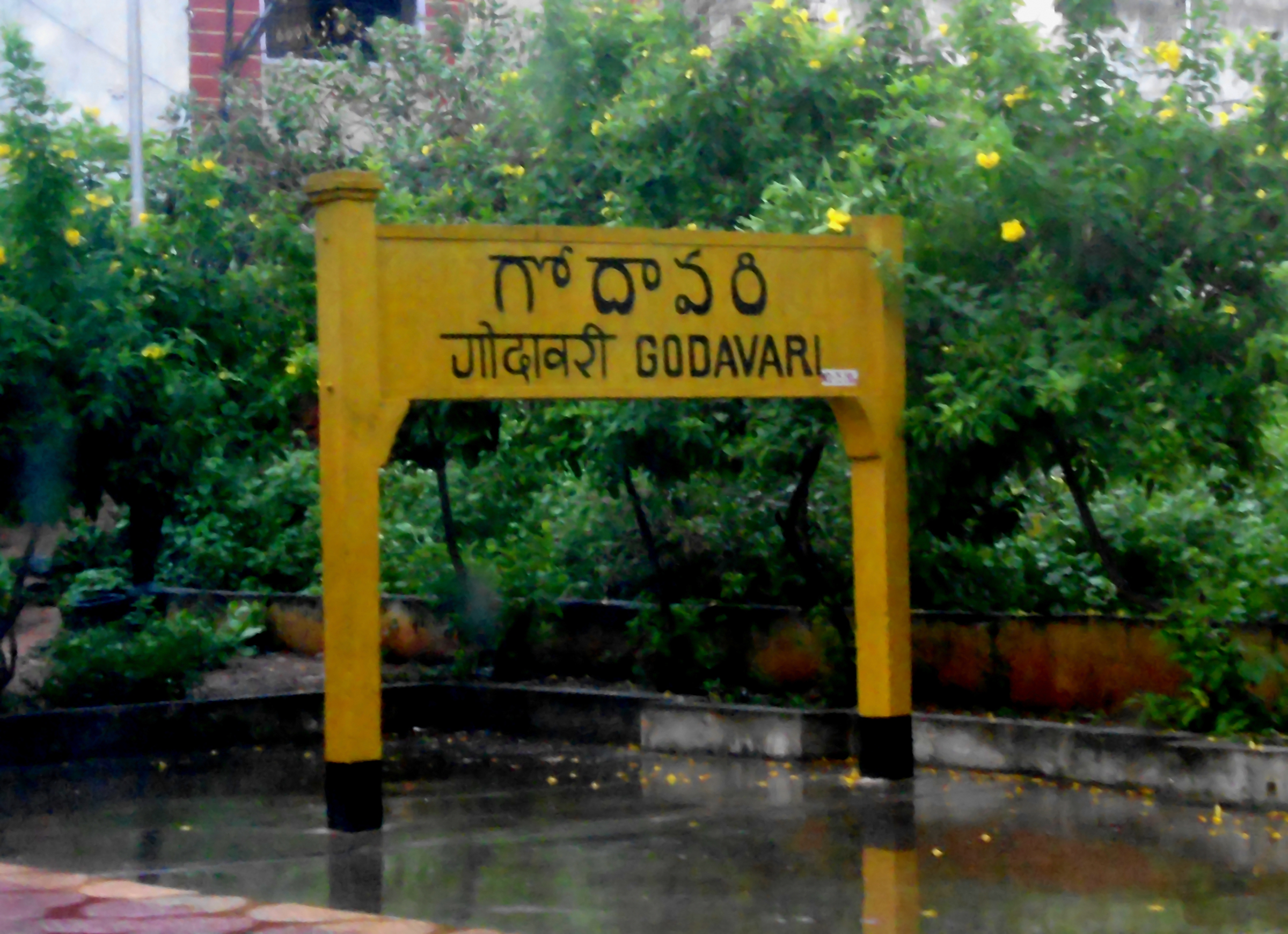
- Godavari railway station

General information
- Location: Rajamahendravaram, Andhra Pradesh; India
- Coordinates: 17°00′26″N 81°46′17″E
- Elevation: 14 m (46 ft)
- System: Indian Railways station
- Line: Visakhapatnam–Vijayawada section of Howrah–Chennai main line
- Platforms: 2
- Tracks: 5 ft 6 in (1,676 mm) broad gauge

Construction
- Structure type: Standard (on ground station)

Other information
- Status: Functioning
- Station code: GVN
- Zone(s): South Central Railway
- Division(s): Vijayawada
Location
- Location within Andhra Pradesh Location within India
- Interactive map

Godavari railway station (station code:GVN), is a railway station in Rajahmundry. It falls in the Vijayawada railway division of the South Coast Railway of the Indian Railways.

There are two railway stations in Rajahmahendravaram.

1. Rajahmundry Railway Station
2. Godavari Railway Station

== Classification ==
In terms of earnings and outward passengers handled, Godavari is categorized as a Non-Suburban Grade-5 (NSG-5) railway station. Based on the re–categorization of Indian Railway stations for the period of 2017–18 and 2022–23, an NSG–5 category station earns between ₹1–₹10 crore and handles 1–2 million passengers.

== Station amenities ==
It is one of the 38 stations in the division to be equipped with Automatic Ticket Vending Machines (ATVMs).

Preceding station	Indian Railways	Following station
Rajahmundry towards Visakhapatnam	South Coast Railway zone Visakhapatnam–Vijayawada section via Godavari Arch Bridge of Howrah–Chennai main line	Kovvur towards Vijayawada
