= Godawari =

Gedawari may refer to:

- Godawari, Kailali, a municipality in Kailali, Nepal.
- Godawari, Lalitpur, a municipality in Lalitpur, Nepal
- Godawari Khola, a river in Nepal

== See also ==
- Godavari (disambiguation)
- Godwari dialect, spoken in Rajasthan, India
