= Vijjeswaram =

Coordinates: 16°56′N 81°44′E

Vijjeswaram is a village near the Godavari River in the Nidadavolu mandal (revenue division) of East Godavari district, Andhra Pradesh, India.

The village is 9 km to the east from the Nidadavolu railway station. It is connected by road to Nidadavolu, which routes via Samisragudem and Gopavaram. It is located about 17 km west of Rajahmundry, the district headquarters. Rajahmundry, Kovvur, Tanuku, and Nidadavolu are nearby railway stations.
