= Dharmavaram, East Godavari district =

Dharmavaram
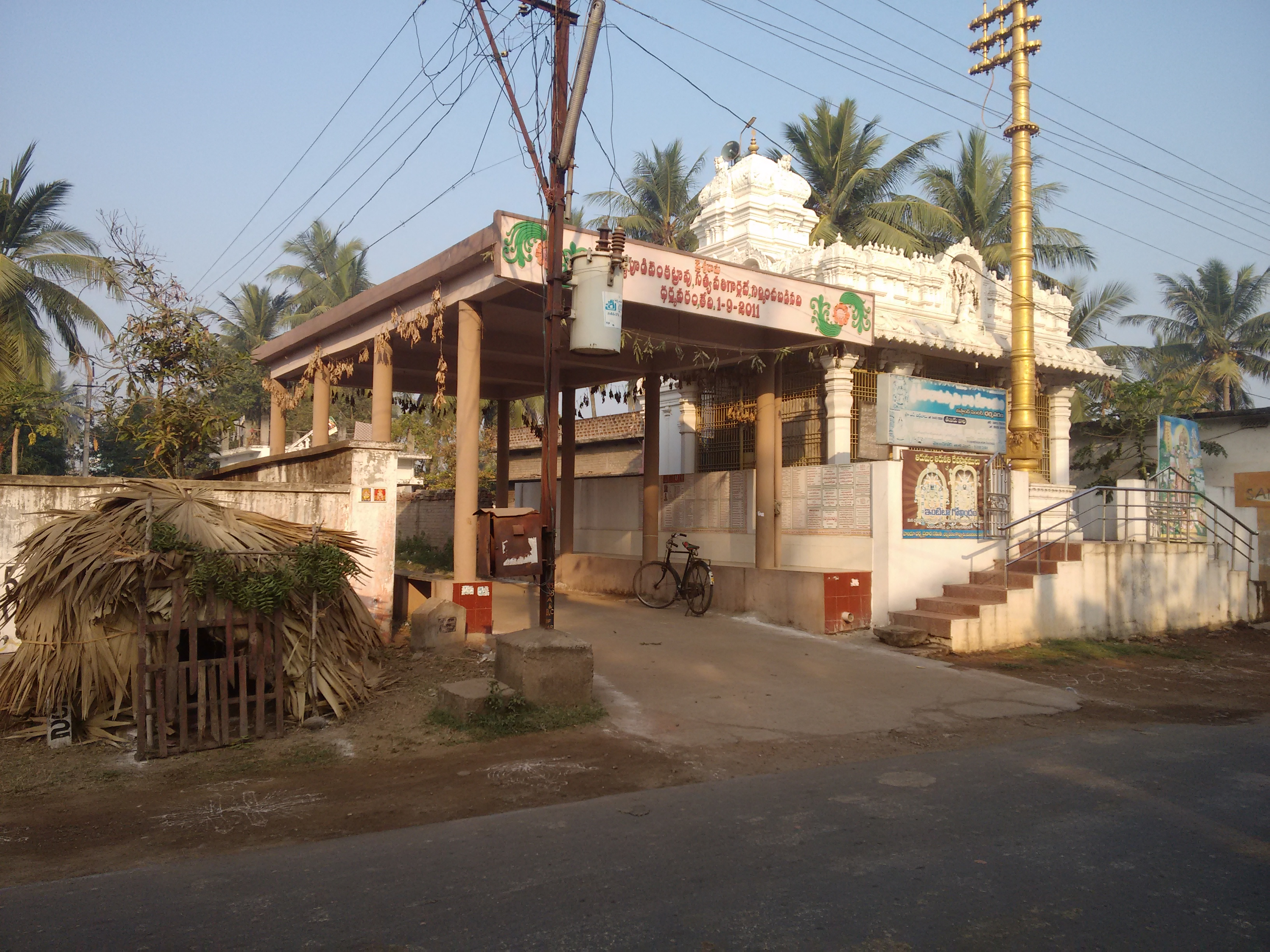
- Ramalayam Temple, Dharmavaram
- Interactive map of Dharmavaram
- Location in Andhra Pradesh, India
- Coordinates: 17.017°N 81.731°E
- Country: India
- Mandal: Kovvur
- District: East Godavari
- State: Andhra Pradesh

Population (2001)
  - Total: 4,191

Languages
  - Official: Telugu
- Time zone: UTC+5:30 (IST)
- PIN: 534340
- Telephone code: +91-8813 (or) 08813
- Website: http://mydharmavaram.blogspot.com/

Dharmavaram is a village in East Godavari district of the Indian state of Andhra Pradesh. It is located in Kovvur mandal.

Dharmavaram belongs to the Coastal Andhra region. It is located 10 km from district headquarters in Kovvur, and 200 km from State capital Amravati. Dharmavaram Pin code is 534340 and postal head office is Vegeswarapuram.

Dharmavaram is a prosperous village near kovvur which is the mandal headquarters for it. It has a population of around four thousand in number. It has its own dedicated village panchayat office, one district secondary school and one village library. Also there are a dedicated co-operative society which is handy for farmers to get any fertilizers for the crops, Water Plant, Andhra bank, Private Hospital and a primary Health centre which always reaches out to people to render its services in grave times and a Rice Mill. The majority of the population lives on agriculture due to availability of good water resources. The people in Dharmavaram are well educated. It boasts of many educated youth settled in US and other countries, compared to another village in the mandal.

This village comes under the assembly constituency of Kovvur and Loksabha constituency of Rajahmundry. This is a common place to establish any Agricultural industries or cold storages or market yards.

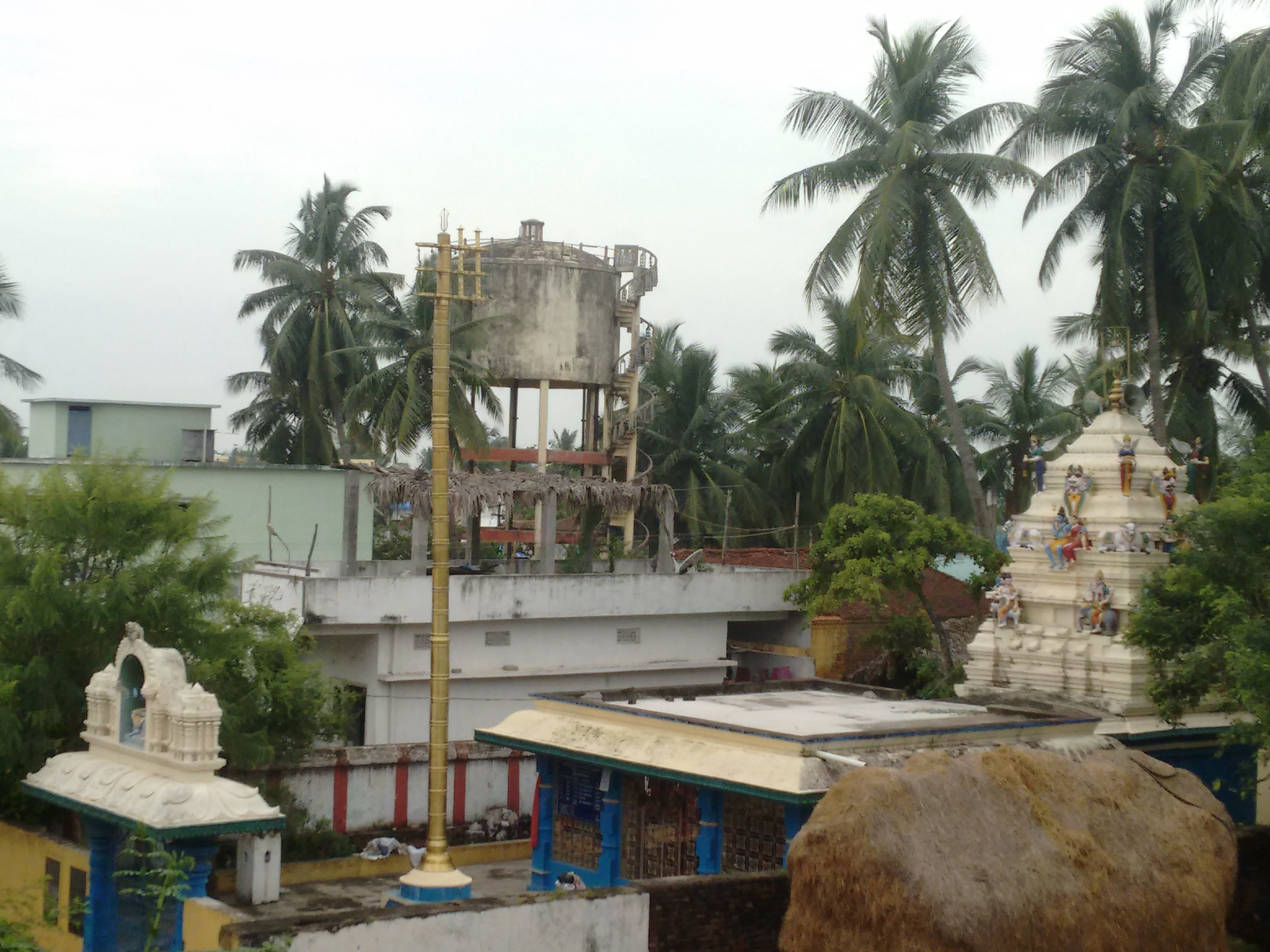
Sivalayam and Water Tank, Dharmavaram

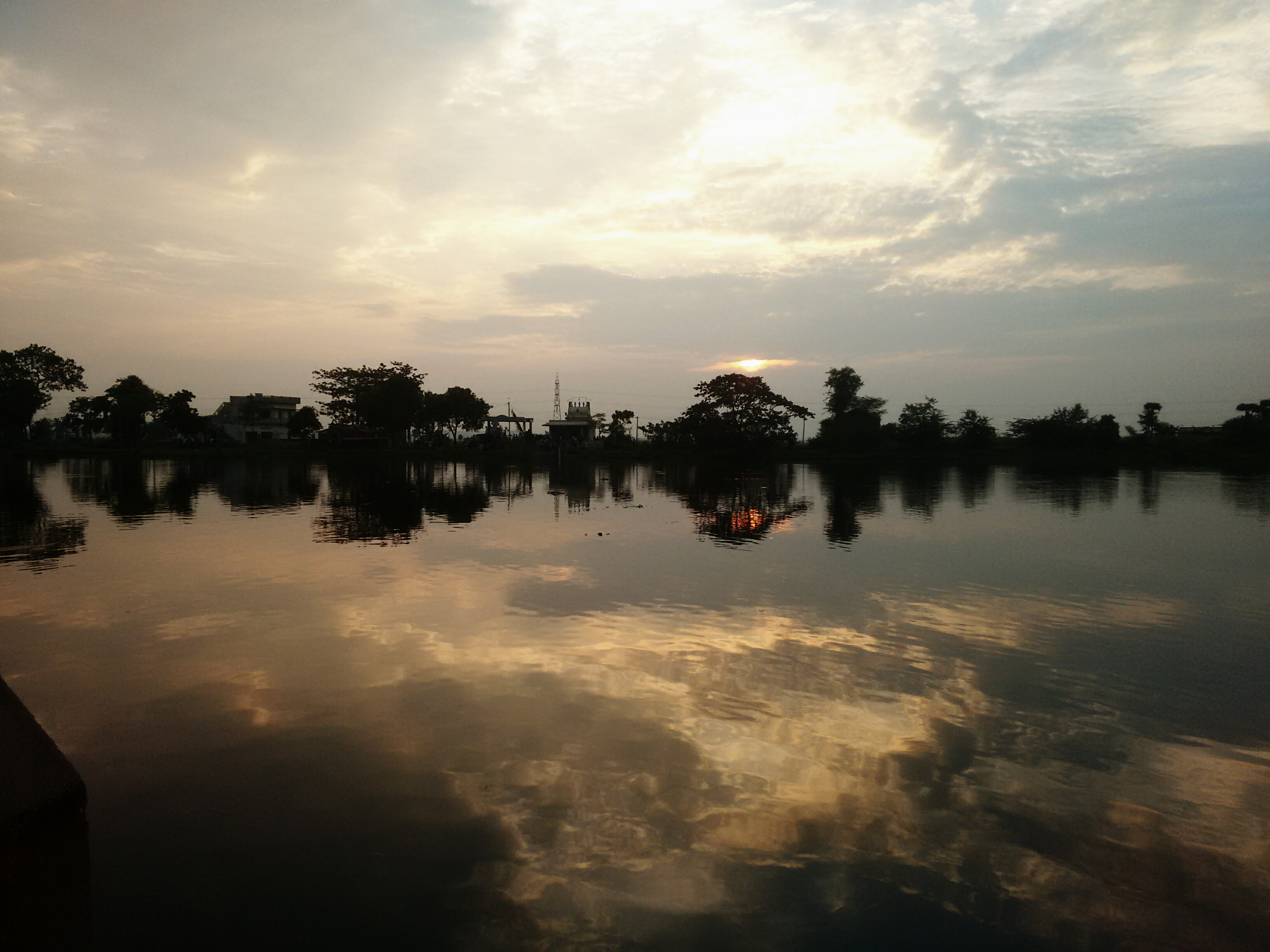
Water Pond, Dharmavaram

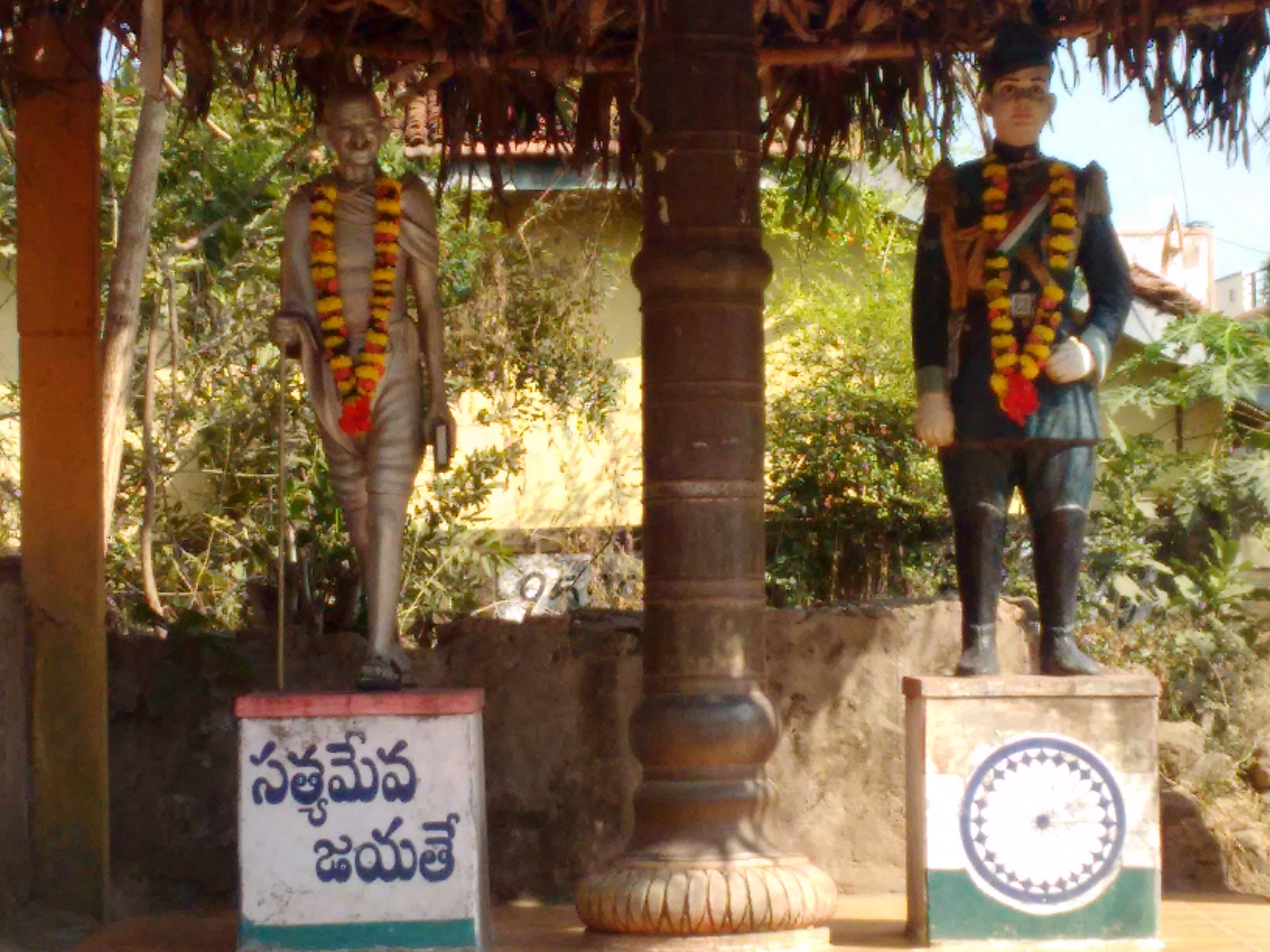
Mahatma Gandhi and Nethaji Gari statues, Dharmavaram

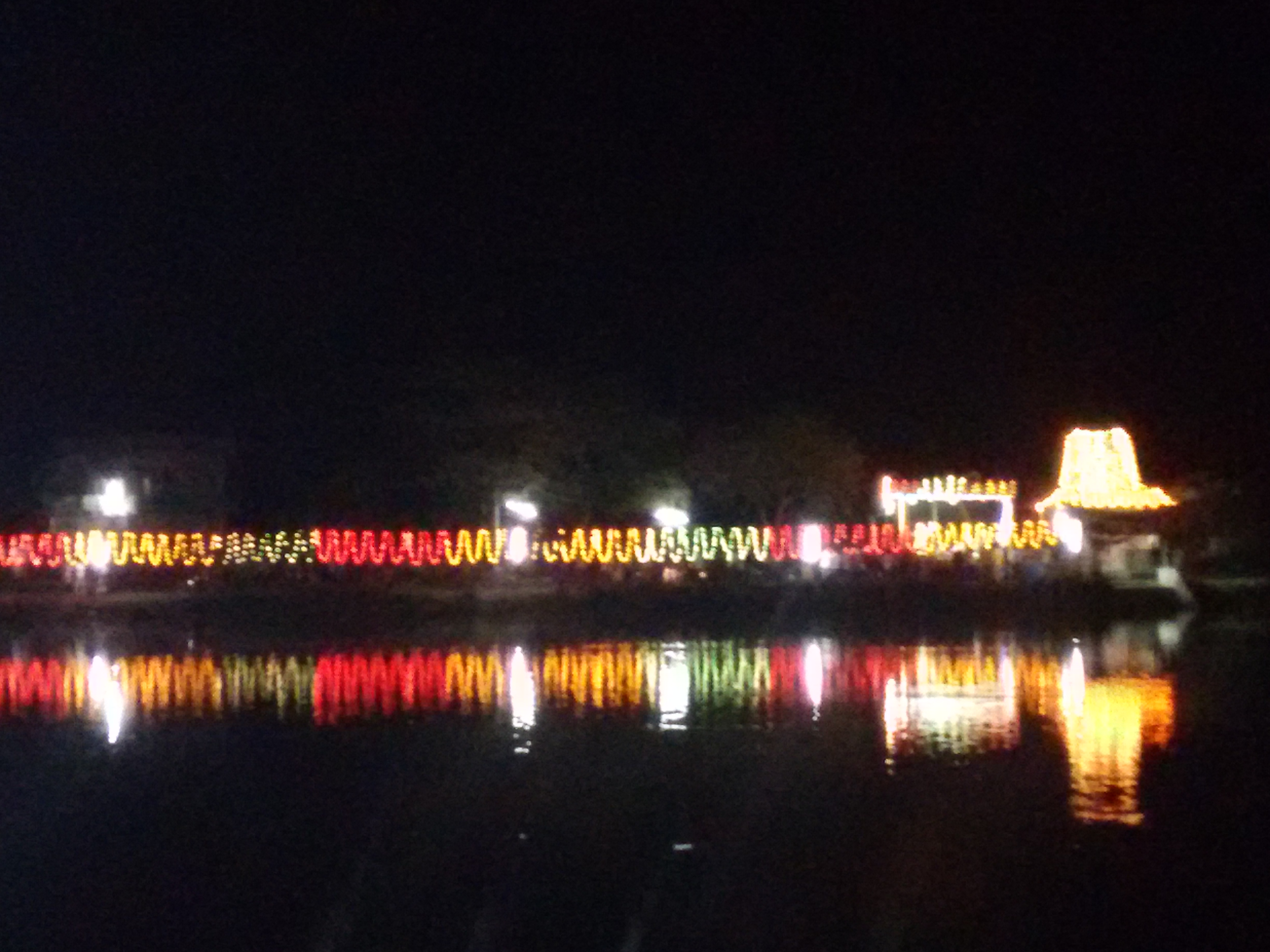
Sri Mutyalamma ammavari Temple, Dharmavaram

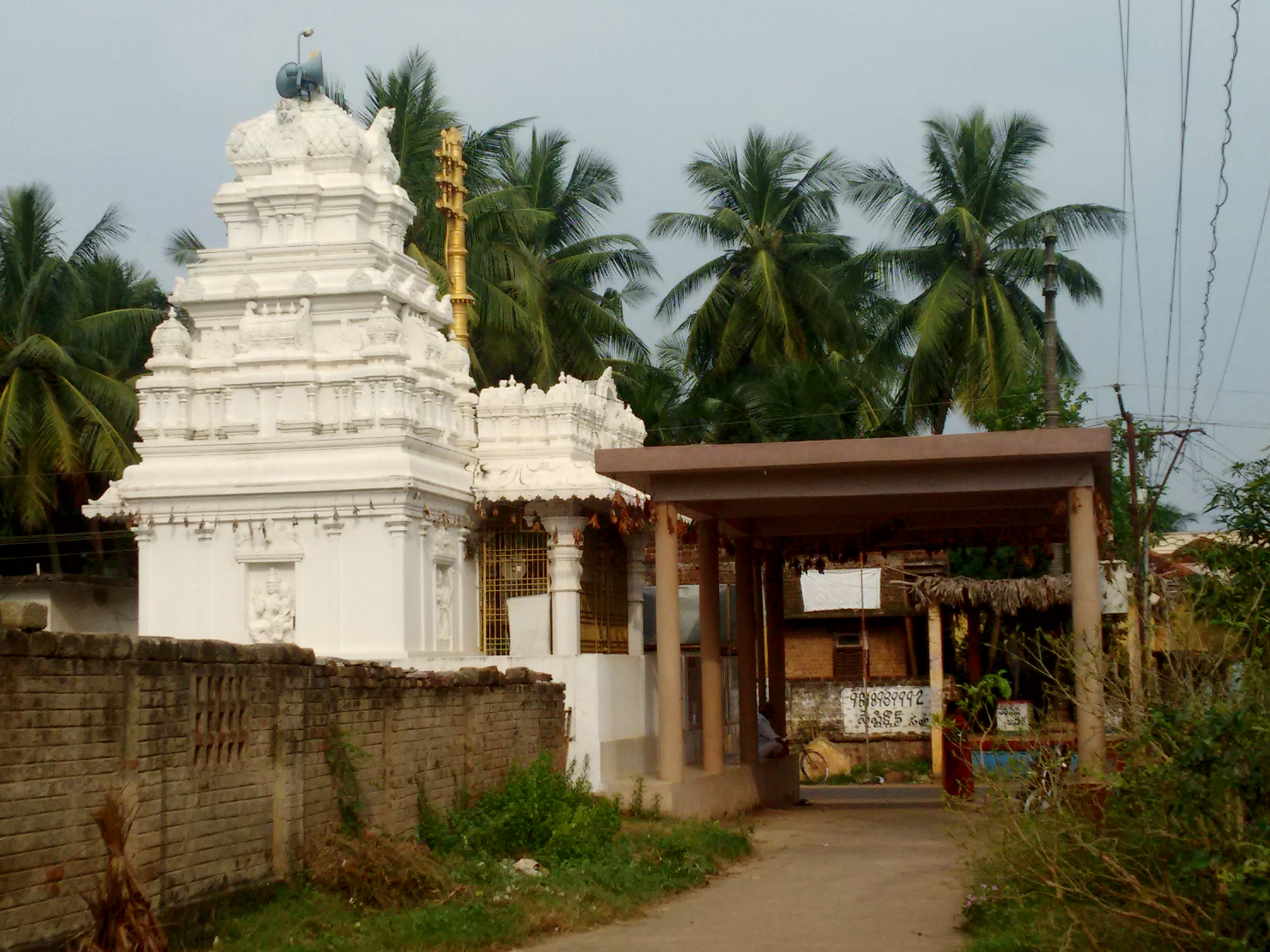
This picture from Dharmavaram

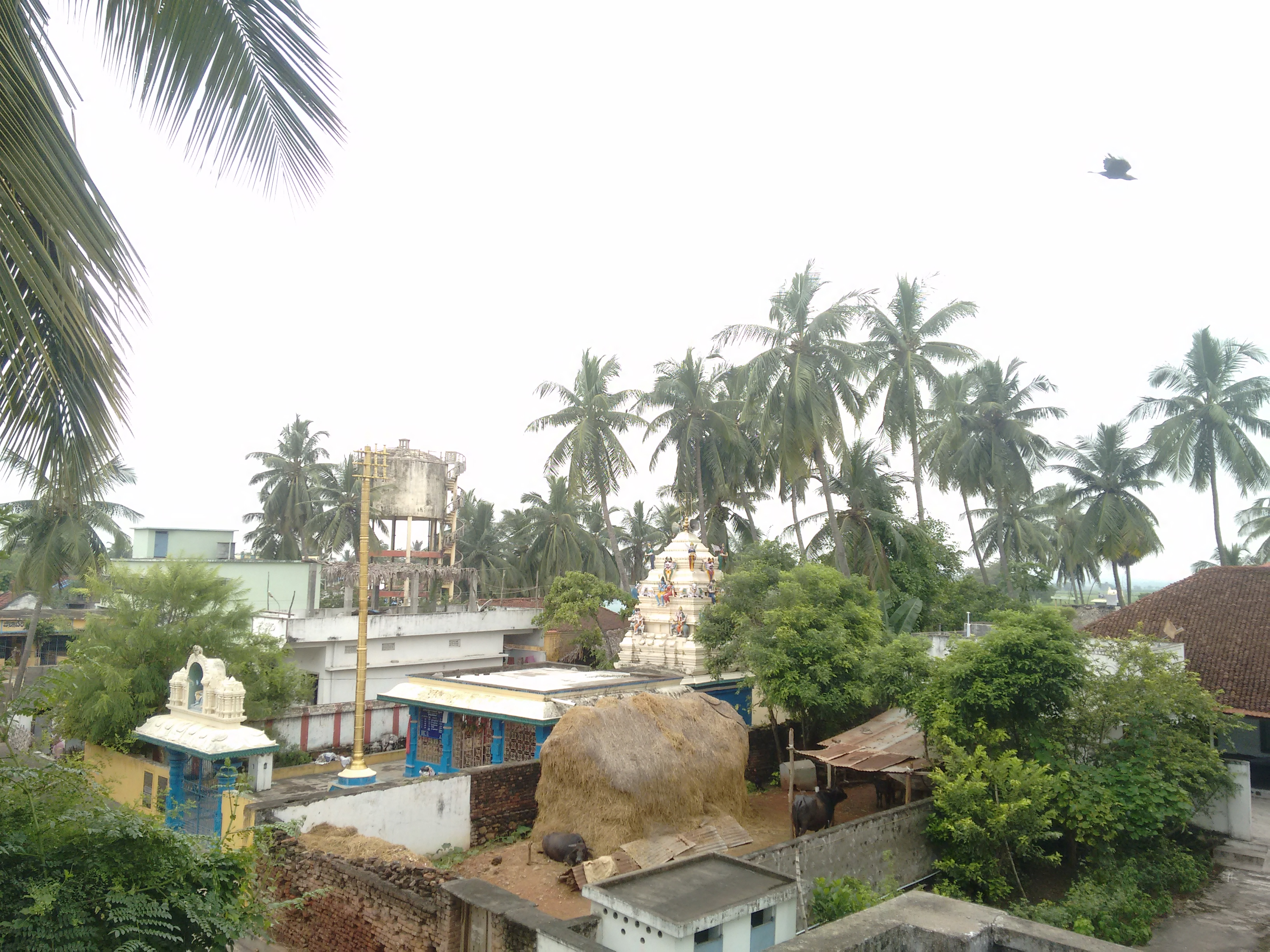
Overview of Dharmavaram

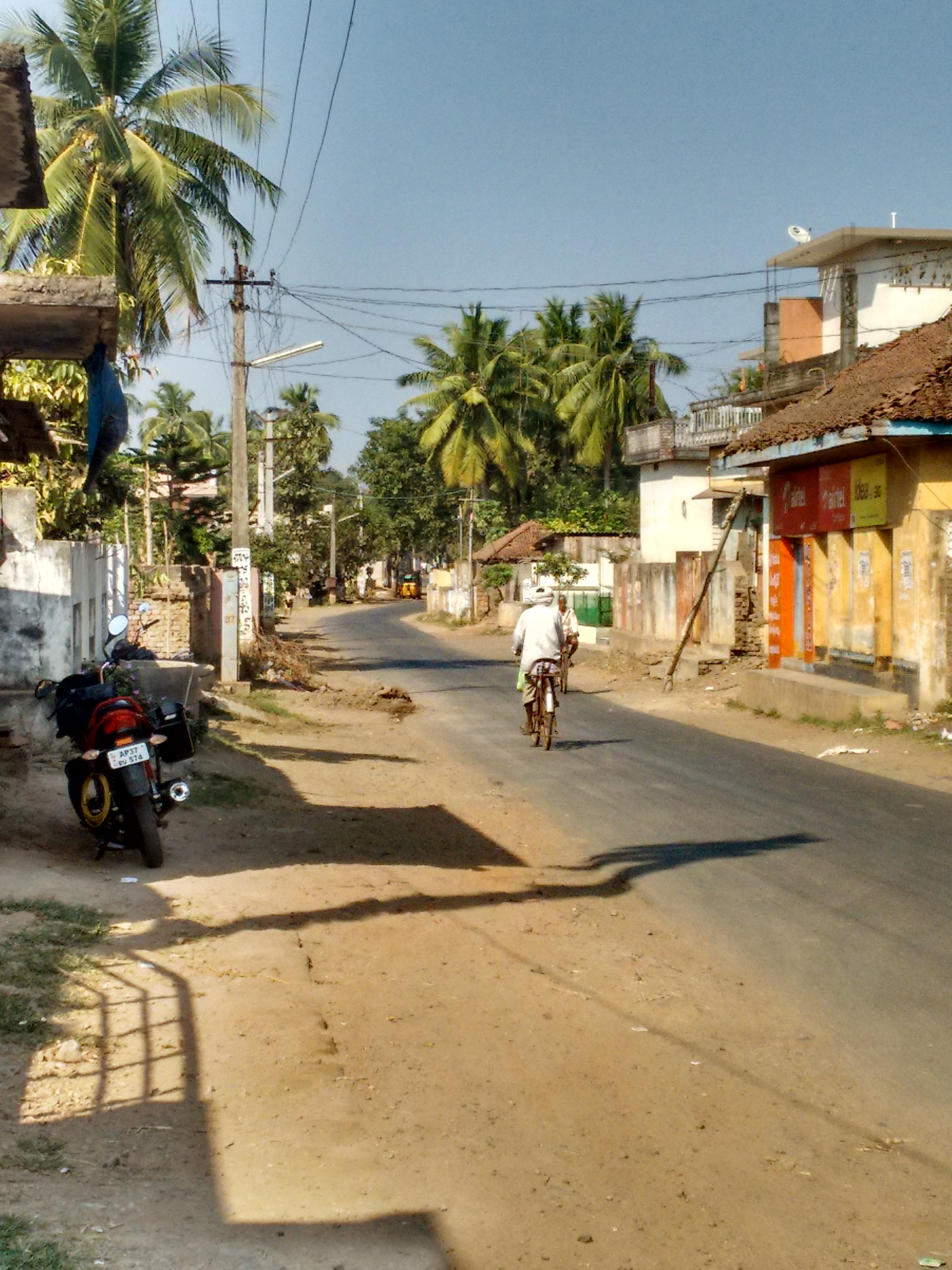
Main Road, Dharmavaram

== Demographics ==
As of 2001 Indian census, the demographic details of Dharmavaram village is as follows:

- Total Population: 4,191 in 1,093 Households
- Male Population: 2,089 and Female Population: 2,102
- Children Under 6-years of age: 495 (Boys - 249 and Girls - 246)
- Total Literates: 2,748
