= Kumaradevam =

- Village
- Interactive map of Kumaradevam
- Location in Andhra Pradesh, India
- Country: India
- State: Andhra Pradesh
- District: East Godavari

Languages
  - Official: Telugu
- Time zone: UTC+5:30 (IST)
- Postal code: 534350
- Vehicle registration: AP 37

Kumara-devam is a village in East Godavari district of the Indian state of Andhra Pradesh. It is located in Kovvur mandal. Kovvur railway Station and Pasivedala railway Station are the nearest train stations.

== Demographics ==
As of 2011 Census of India, Kumaradevan had a population of 4015. The total population constitutes 1911 males and 2104 females with a sex ratio of 1101 females per 1000 males. 363 children are in the age group of 0–6 years, with sex ratio of 1213. The average literacy rate stands at 72.12%.
