= Dharmavaram, Durgi mandal =

Dharmavaram
- Village
- Interactive map of Dharmavaram
- Location in Andhra Pradesh, India
- Coordinates: 16.42423°N 79.492722°E
- Country: India
- State: Andhra Pradesh
- Region: Palnadu
- District: Guntur

Government
  - Sarpanch: Chirumamilla Madhusudhana Rao

Area
  - Total: 10.86 km^{2} (4.19 sq mi)
- Elevation: 144 m (472 ft)

Population (2011)
  - Total: 2,999
  - Density: 276.2/km^{2} (715.2/sq mi)

Languages
  - Official: Telugu
- Time zone: UTC+5:30 (IST)
- PIN: 522 612
- Telephone code: 08642
- Vehicle registration: AP-07

Dharmavaram is a village in Palnadu district of the Indian state of Andhra Pradesh. It is located in Durgi mandal of Narasaraopet revenue division.
