= INS Godavari =

The following ships of the Indian Navy have been named Godavari:

- HMIS Godavari (U52) was a Black Swan-class sloop commissioned into the Royal Indian Navy in 1943, where she served in World War II, and transferred to Pakistan in 1948
- INS Godavari (D92) was a Type II Hunt-class destroyer, formerly HMS Bedale of the Royal Navy where she served in World War II. Commissioned into the Indian Navy in 1953, she was decommissioned and scrapped in 1979.
- INS Godavari (F20) was the lead vessel of her class of guided-missile frigates. Commissioned in 1983, she was decommissioned in 2015.
