= Damavaram =

Village in Andhra Pradesh, India

Coordinates: 14.702347°N 79.947142°E

Damavaram is a village in Nellore district, Andhra Pradesh, India. In a 2011 census it had a population of 2,817.
