= Dharmavaram, Vizianagaram district =

Dharmavaram
- village
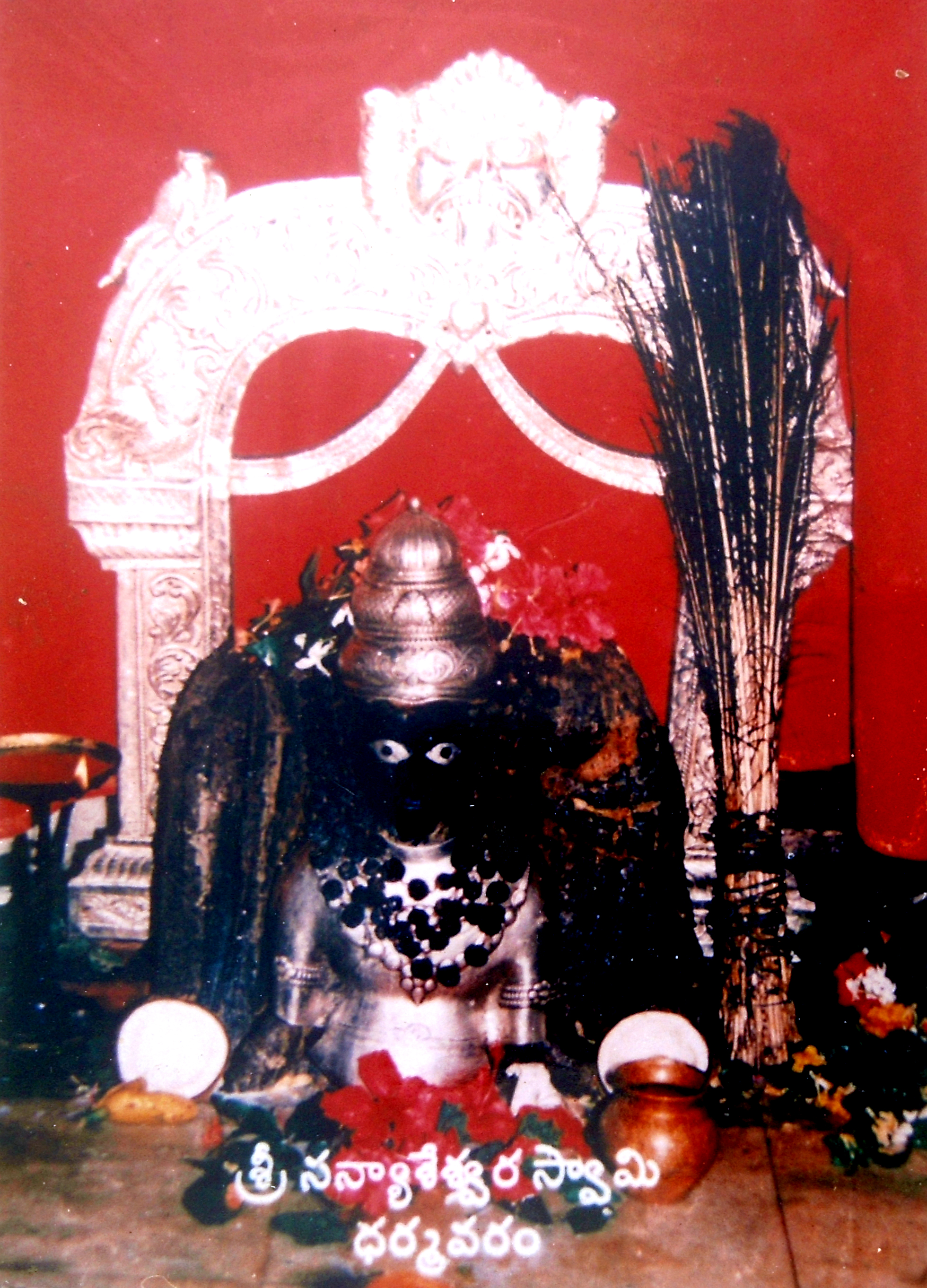
- Sanyaseswara Swamy at Dharmavaram
- Interactive map of Dharmavaram
- Location in Andhra Pradesh, India Dharmavaram (India)
- Coordinates: 18°11′N 83°18′E
- Country: India
- State: Andhra Pradesh
- District: Vizianagaram

Population
  - Total: 10,000

Languages
  - Official: Telugu
- Time zone: UTC+5:30 (IST)
- PIN: 535148
- Vehicle registration: AP-35
- Nearest city: Srungavarapukota
- Lok Sabha constituency: Visakhapatnam
- Vidhan Sabha constituency: Srungavarapukota

Dharmavaram is a village panchayat in Srungavarapukota mandal of Vizianagaram district in Andhra Pradesh, India.
