= Old Godavari Bridge =

Bridge over the Godavari RIver in Andhra Pradesh, India

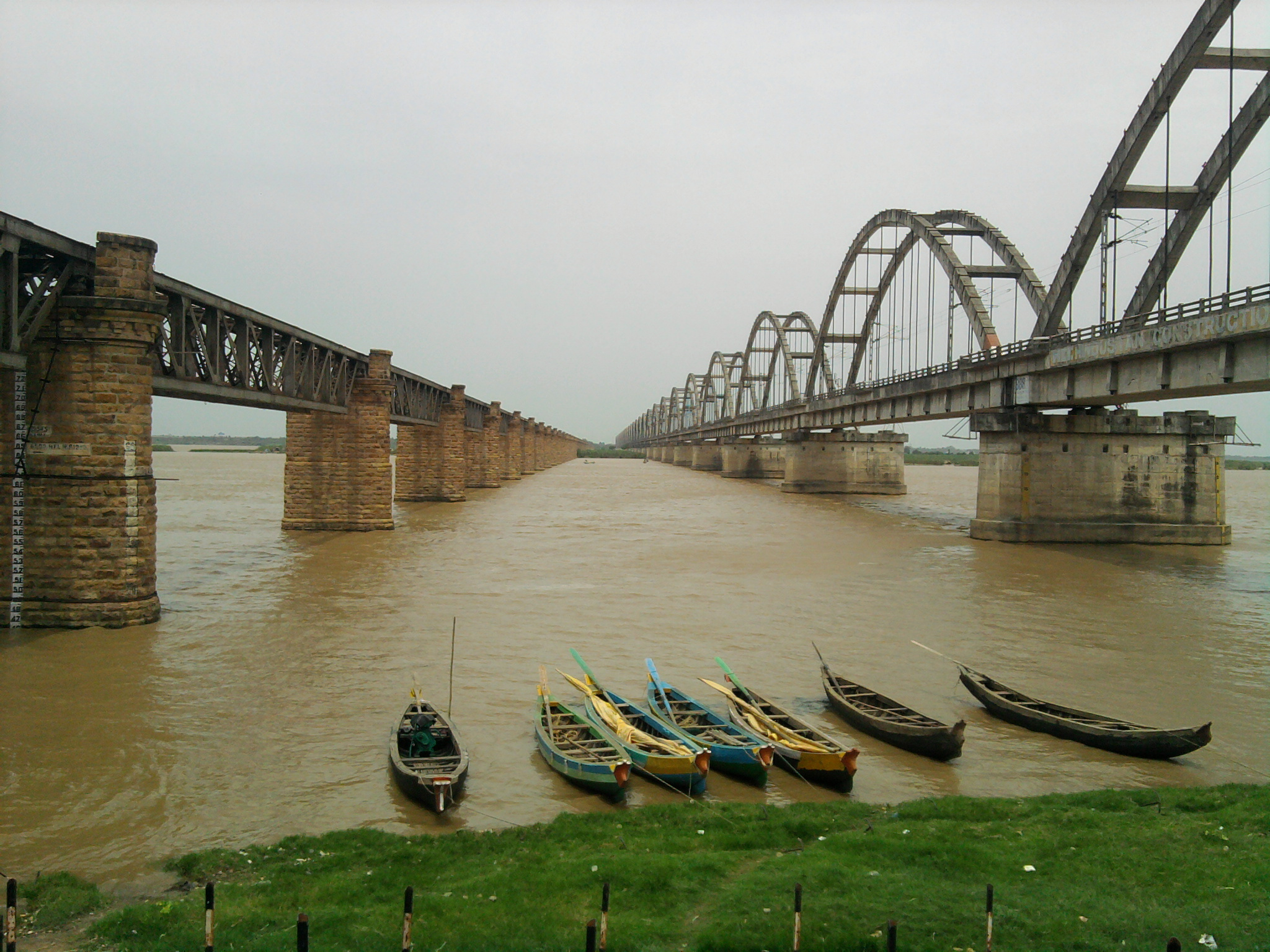
- Havelock Bridge on the left and Godavari Arch Bridge on the right.
- Coordinates: 17°00′26.6″N 81°45′21″E
- Carries: Railway Line
- Crosses: Godavari River
- Locale: Rajamahendravaram, India
- Official name: The Havelock Bridge
- Other name: Old Godavari Bridge
- Followed by: Godavari Arch Bridge

Characteristics
- Total length: 2.7 kilometres (1.7 mi)
- Design life: 100 years

History
- Construction start: 11 November 1897
- Opened: 30 August 1900
- Closed: 1997

Location
- Interactive map of Old Godavari Bridge

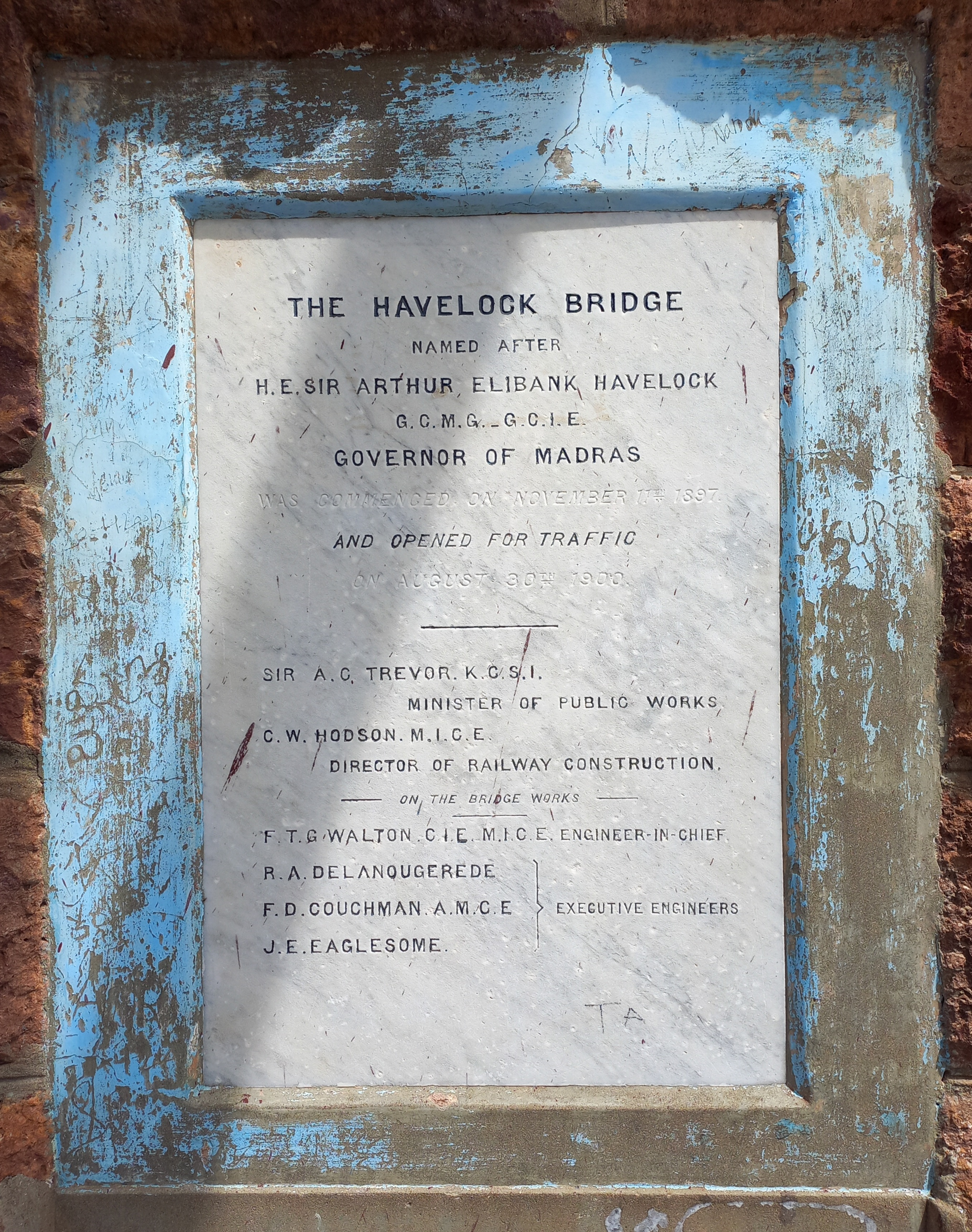
The Havelock Bridge plaque commissioned in 1897 AD and opened for traffic in 1900 AD

The Old Godavari Bridge (also known as The Havelock Bridge) is a decommissioned bridge that spans the Godavari River in Andhra Pradesh, India. Commissioned in 1900, the bridge served trains plying between Howrah and Madras. It is the earliest of three bridges that span the Godavari River at Rajamahendravaram. The Godavari Arch Bridge was later constructed as a replacement for the Havelock Bridge. The bridge along with the Godavari bridge and Godavari Arch Bridge is one of the most recognised symbols of Kovvur and Rajamahendravaram of the state of Andhra Pradesh.

== History ==
The construction of the bridge commenced on 11 November 1897 and opened for traffic on 30 August 1900. The Bridge was named after Sir Arthur Elibank Havelock, the then Governor of Madras. Frederick Thomas Granville Walton served as the Engineer-in-chief assisted by executive engineers R.A.Delanougerede, F.D.Couchman, J.E.Eaglesome.

The bridge was constructed with stone masonry and steel girders. It has 56 spans each of 45.7 metres (150 ft)and is 3,480 metres (11,420 ft) long. The girders were fabricated by Butterley Company of Ripley, Derbyshire. The rail bridge served the busy Howrah-Chennai line until its decommissioning.

Having served its full life span of 100 years, it was decommissioned in 1997, and Godavari Arch Bridge was built as a replacement for the bridge. Today, the bridge is being used to host civic water supply pipelines.

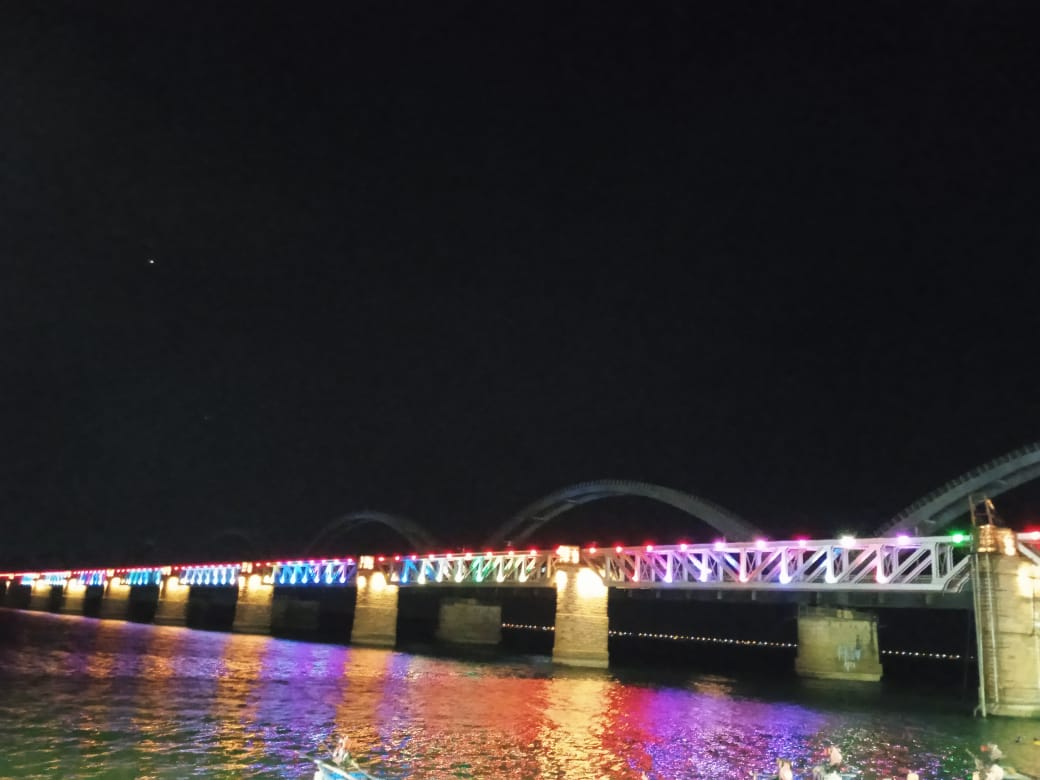
Havelock bridge at night(arch bridge visible)

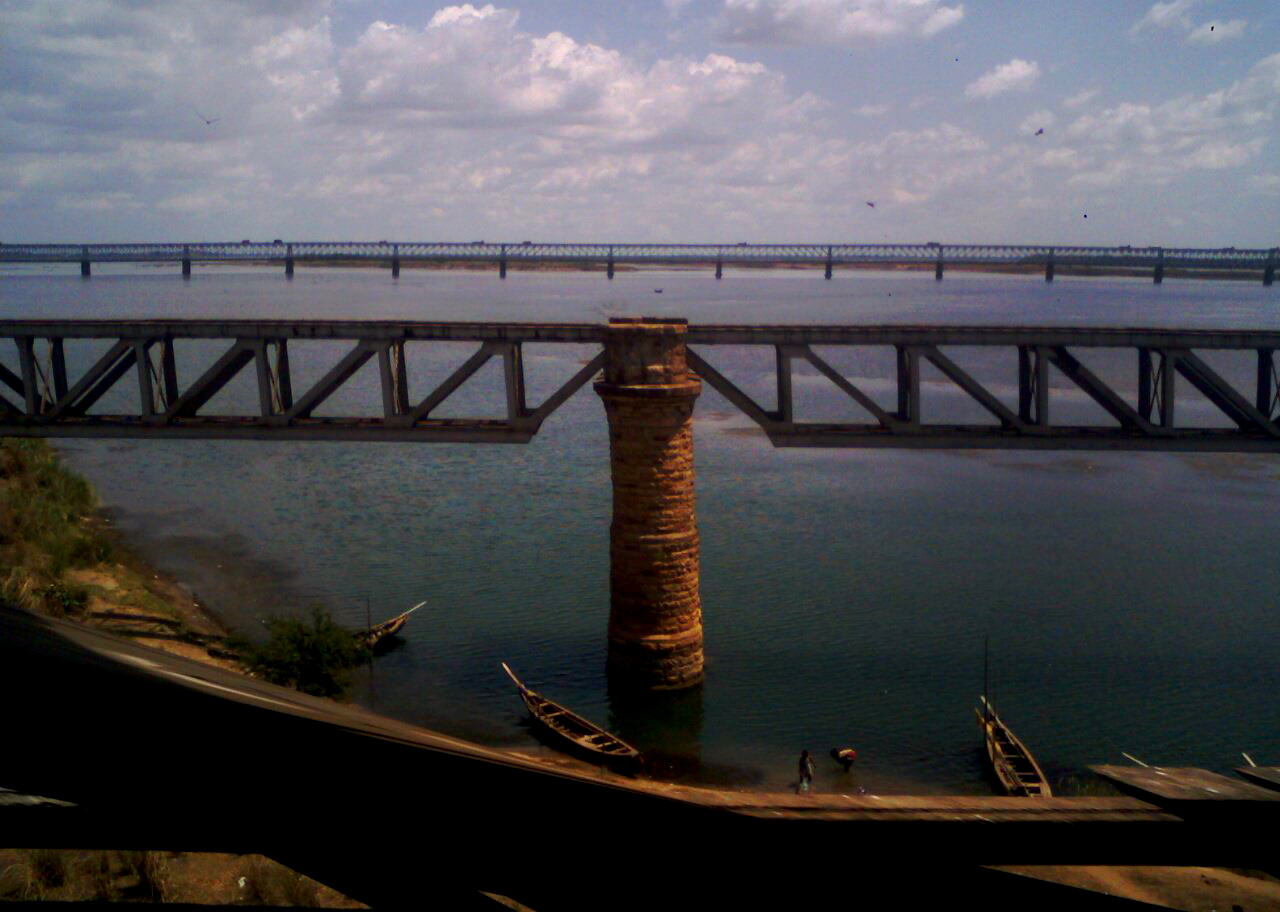
Havelock bridge view

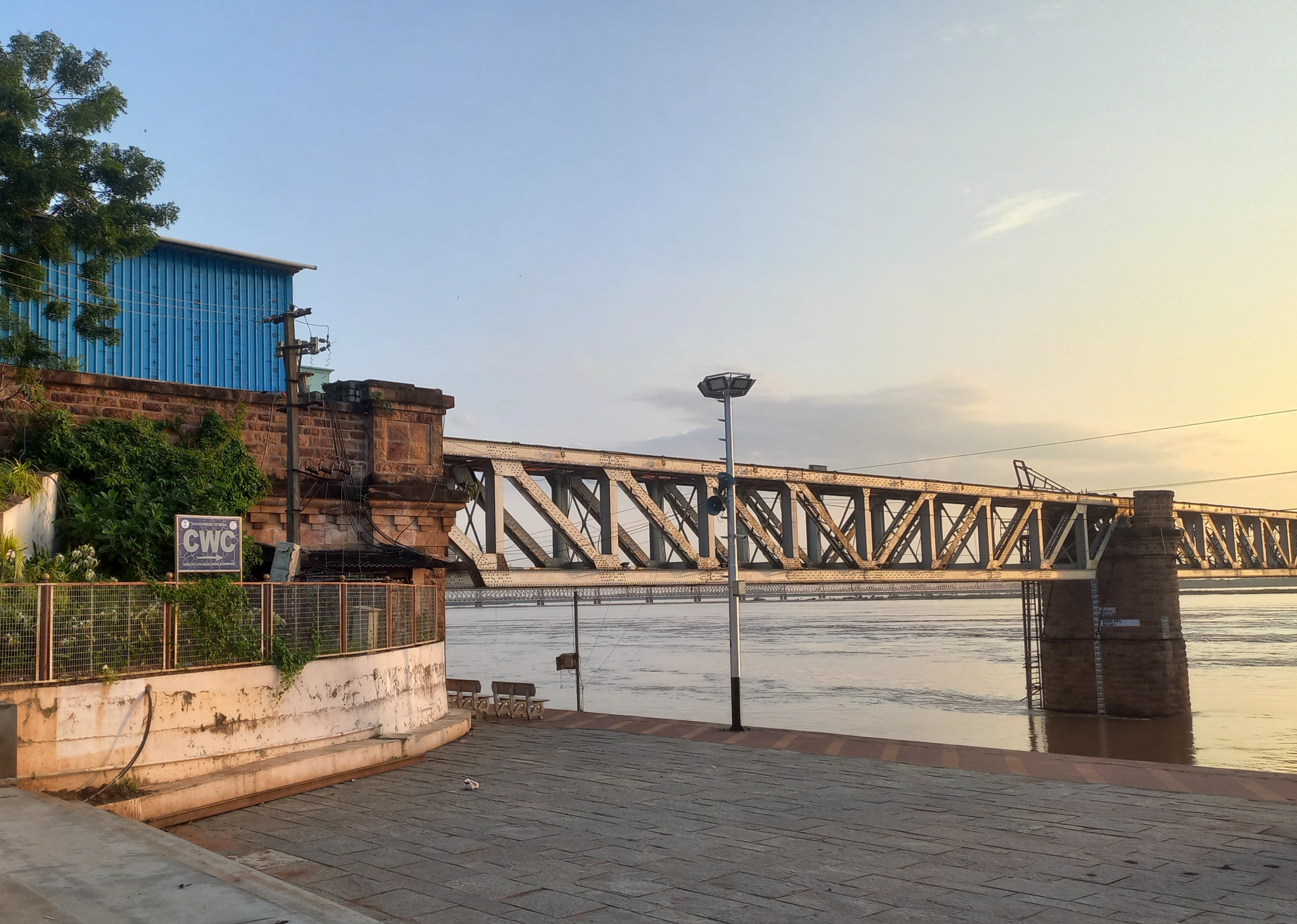
Rajamahendravaram end point of Havelock Bridge

== Present status ==
After being planned to be converted into a national monument, historic monument now its finally planned to be converted into a tourist spot, as a pedestrian pathway. In 2008 the Municipal Corporation of Rajamahendravaram passed a resolution expressing willingness to take up the beautification project. With the Railways Ministry not coming forward for implementation of the project, Former Member of Parliament Vundavalli Aruna Kumar has appealed to the Railways Ministry for the approval of the project. As of 2017 the project was still awaiting funds to commence.

== Sister bridges ==
- Godavari Bridge
- Godavari Arch Bridge

== See also ==
- List of longest bridges in the world
