= Godavari Bridge =

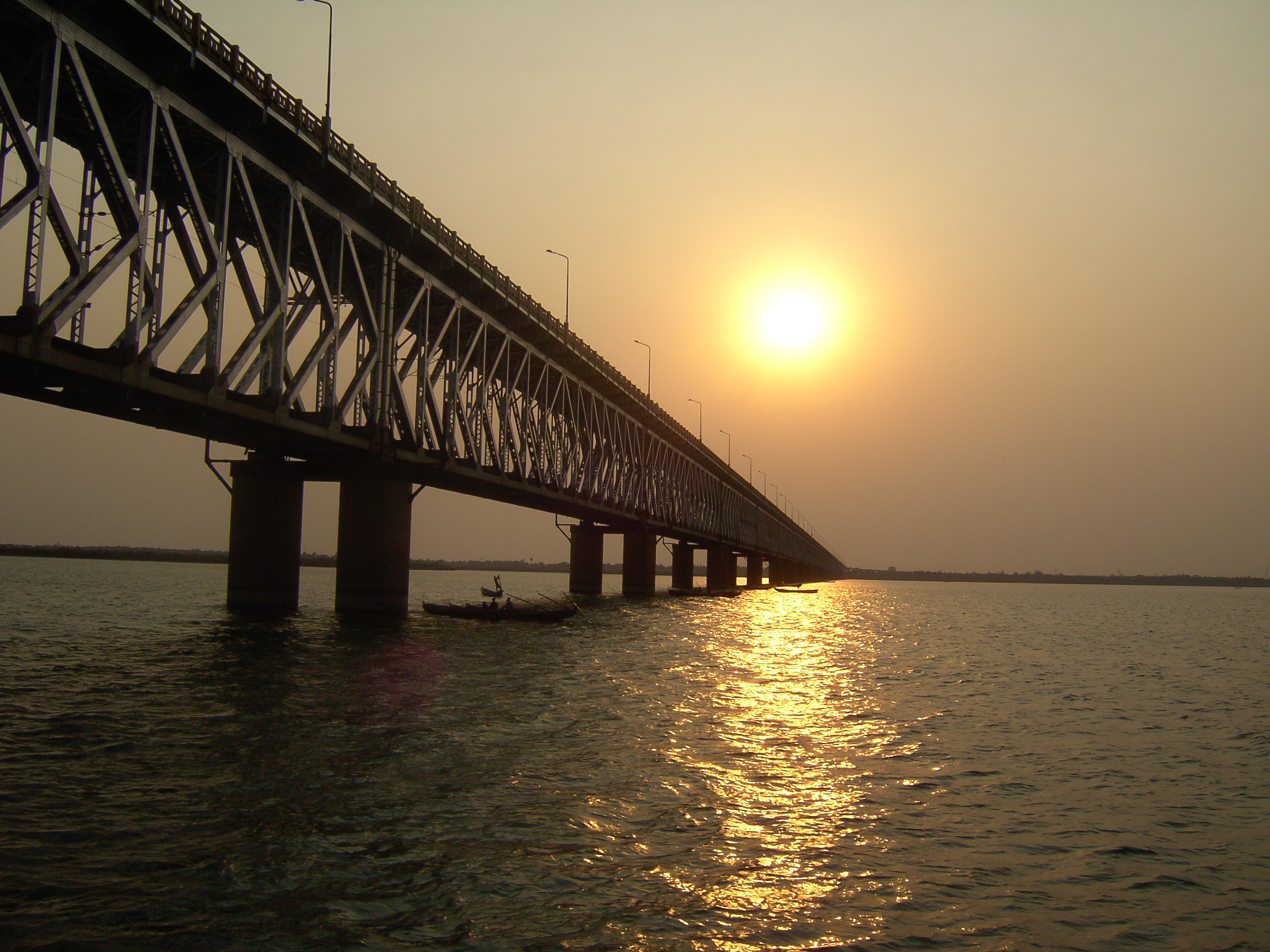
- The Godavari Bridge
- Coordinates: 16°59′52″N 81°45′21″E
- Carries: Two lanes of Road and Single Railway line.
- Crosses: Godavari River
- Locale: Rajamahendravaram
- Other name: Rajamahendravaram–Kovvur Bridge
- Preceded by: The Havelock Bridge
- Followed by: Godavari Arch Bridge

Characteristics
- Design: Truss Bridge
- Total length: 4.1 kilometres (2.5 mi)
- Longest span: 91.5 metres (300 ft)
- No. of spans: 27

History
- Engineering design by: Braithwaite, Burn & Jessop Construction Company
- Opened: 16 August 1974; 52 years ago

Location
- Interactive map of Godavari Bridge

The Godavari Bridge or Kovvur–Rajamahendravaram Bridge is a truss bridge spanning the Godavari River in Rajamahendravaram, India. It is India's fourth longest road-cum-rail bridge crossing a water body, the first one being the Bogibeel Bridge over the Brahmaputra in Assam, and second is Digha–Sonpur Bridge over the Ganga in Bihar.

The Godavari bridge is 4.1 kilometers (2.8 km Rail part & 4.1 km Road part) long consisting of 27 spans of 91.5 m and 7 spans of 45.72 m of which 6 spans of 45.72m are in 6 deg. curve at long Rajamahendravaram end to make up for the built up area. The bridge has a road deck over the single track rail deck, similar to the Grafton Bridge in New South Wales, Australia. This bridge, in addition to Godavari Arch Bridge, has been widely used to represent Rajamahendravaram in arts, media, and culture. It is one of the recognised symbols of Rajamahendravaram.

== Geography ==
The road-cum-rail bridge is built across the Godavari River (largest river in South India at over 1,000 kilometres (620 mi) length) as it enters into the deltaic reach before debouching into the sea 60 kilometres (37 mi) downstream of the bridge, the second largest river in India. At the location of the bridge, near Rajamahendravaram, the river flows with a width of about 2.7 kilometres (1.7 mi), split in two channels with an island formation in between. The maximum discharge observed in the river is reported to be around 3 million m^{3}/s and the maximum velocity of water flow as 5 metres (16 ft) per second.

== History ==
=== Construction ===
During the Third Five-Year plan doubling of railway track between Chennai-Howrah was planned. Most of the route had been doubled except the small stretch of track between Kovvur and Rajamahendravaram where a bridge had to be built to span the three kilometer long Godavari River. During 1964, the construction of second bridge across Godavari River at Rajamahendravaram was sanctioned as a part of doubling of track between Kovvur and Rajamahendravaram. But there had been a persistent demand from local population for construction of a road link between Kovvur and Rajamahendravaram, which would essentially link East Godavari and West Godavari districts. The Andhra Pradesh State Government came forward with the proposal to add a road deck over the rail bridge under construction as a part of doubling the railway track between Chennai-Howrah.

It was commissioned by South Central Railway division of Indian Railways. Construction of the bridge began in the early 1970s by Braithwaite, Burn & Jessop Construction Company, a group company of Bharat Bhari Udyog Nigam Limited. When completed it was Asia's longest rail -cum- road bridge.

It was inaugurated by the then President of India, Fakhruddin Ali Ahmed in 1974.

== Sister bridges ==
=== Old Godavari bridge ===
The Old Godavari Bridge or Havelock Bridge was constructed in 1900 by Mr.F.T.G.Walton, now retired, this bridge has 56 spans and is 2754 m lengthy. It was constructed with stone masonry and steel girders and is an example of British engineering. The New Godavari Bridge was made as a substitute for it.

=== Godavari arch bridge ===
Godavari Arch Bridge is the third bridge constructed near Rajamahendravaram. Constructed by the Hindustan Construction Company (HCC), this bridge is a modern-day engineering feat. The bridge is made of bow string girder arches. The bridge is fit for 350 km/h rail services. It was commissioned for passenger traffic in March 1997 and became fully operational for running trains by the Indian Railways from 2003.

=== Fourth Godavari bridge ===
New Kovvur–Rajamahendravaram 4th Bridge was opened to traffic in 2015.

== Panorama ==
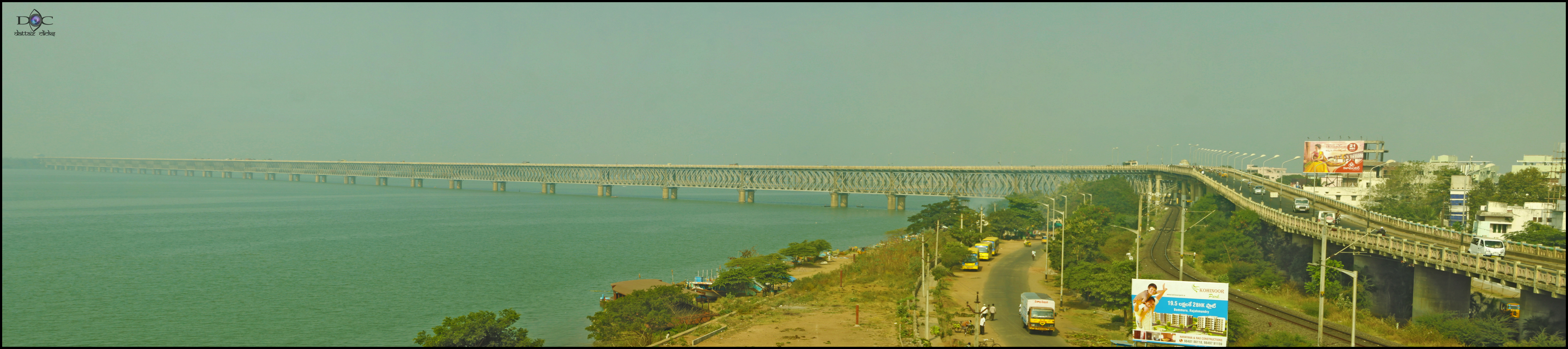

== See also ==
- List of road-rail bridges
- List of longest bridges in the world
- List of longest bridges above water in India

== Gallery ==
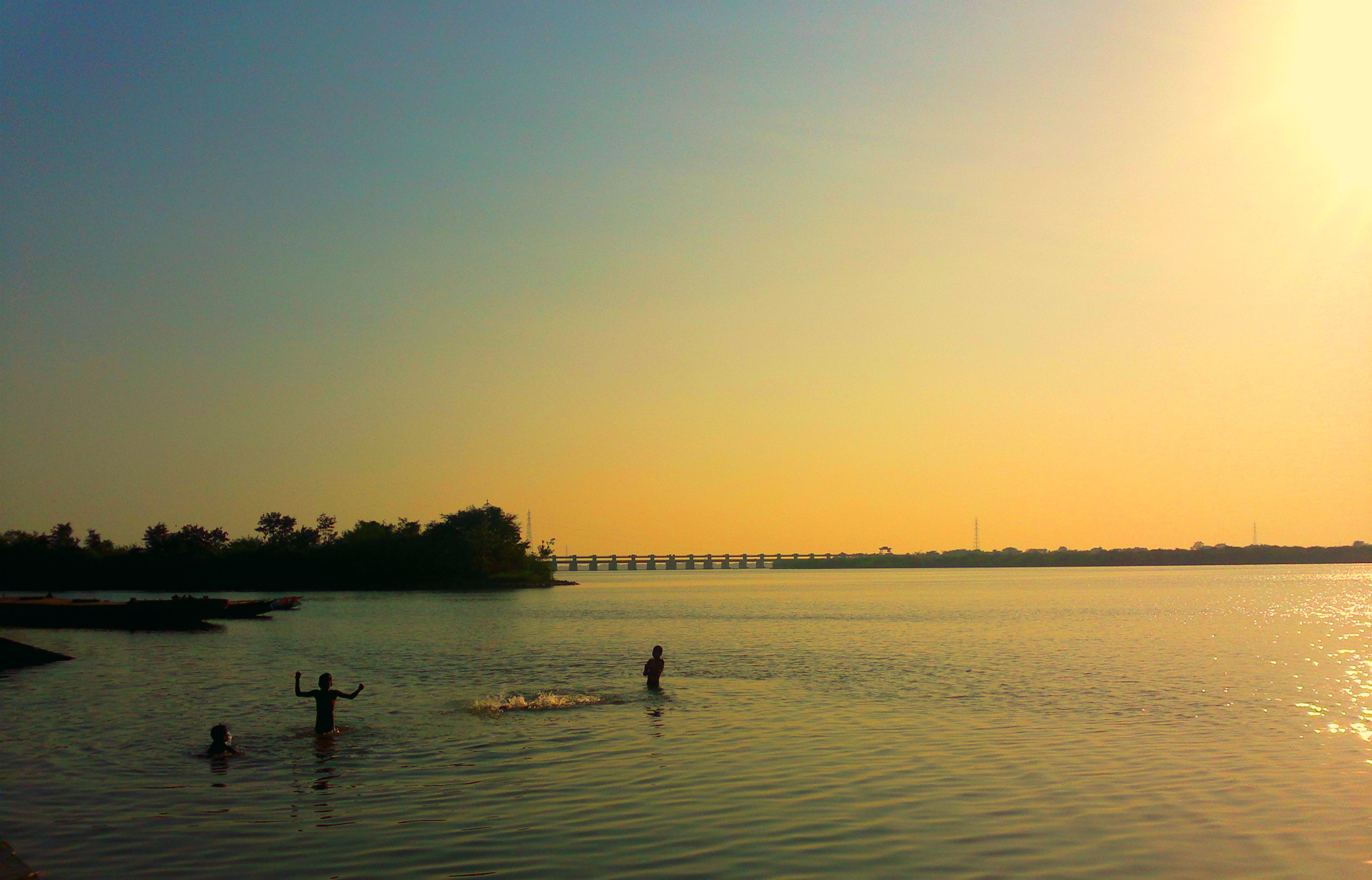
Sunset View at Cotton Barrage in Rajamahendravaram City.

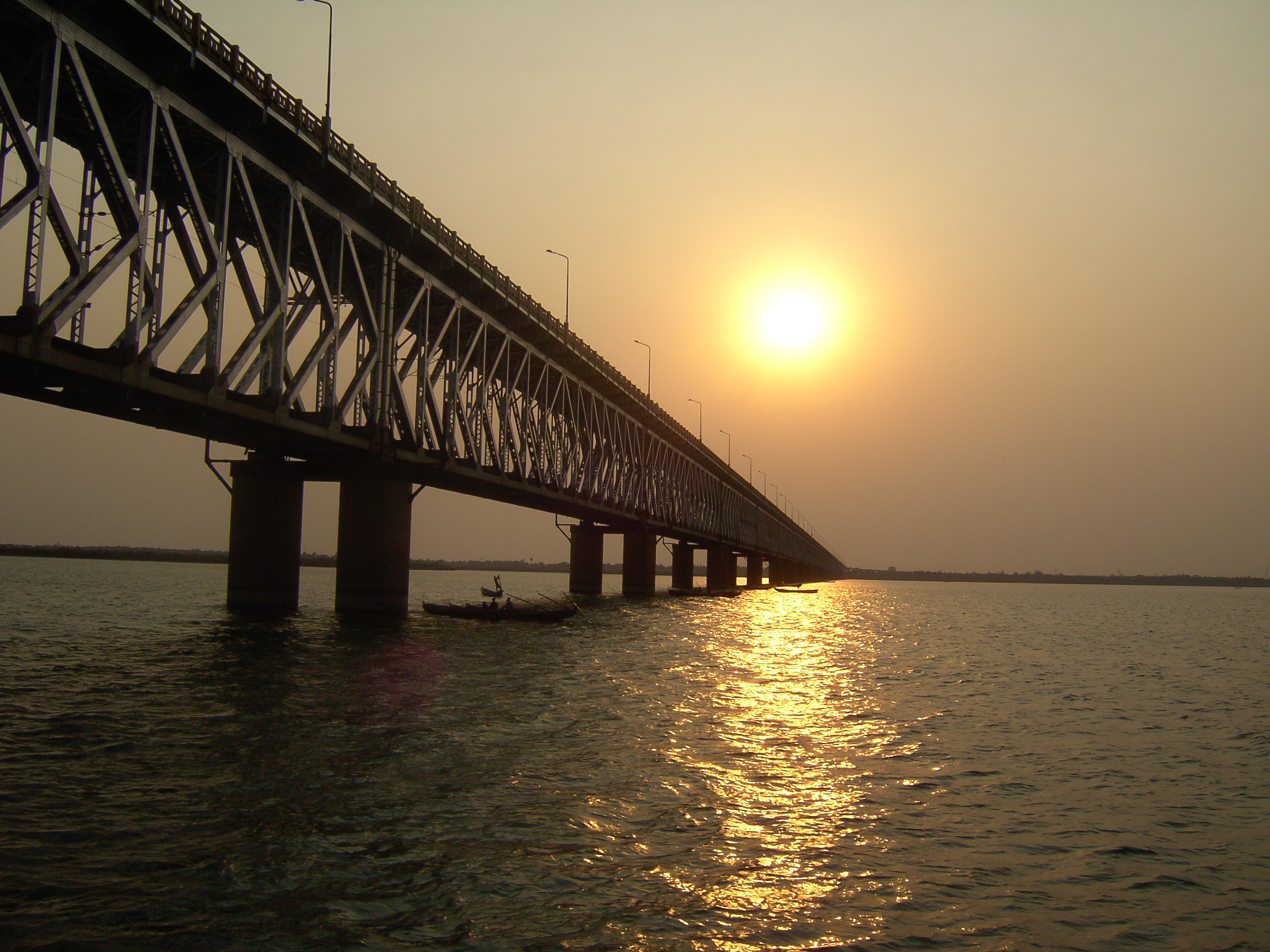
Sunset at the Bridge

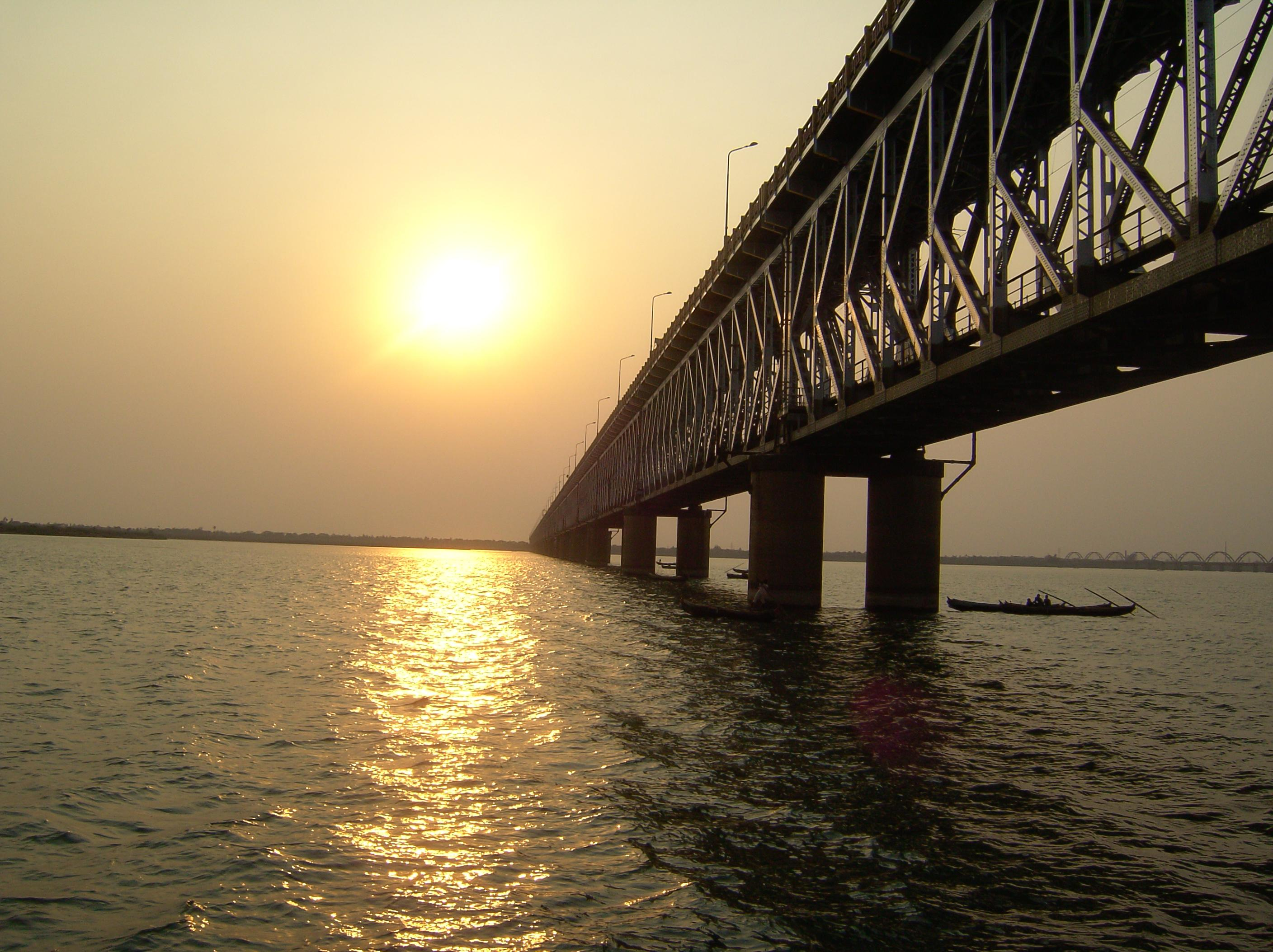
Sunset at the Bridge

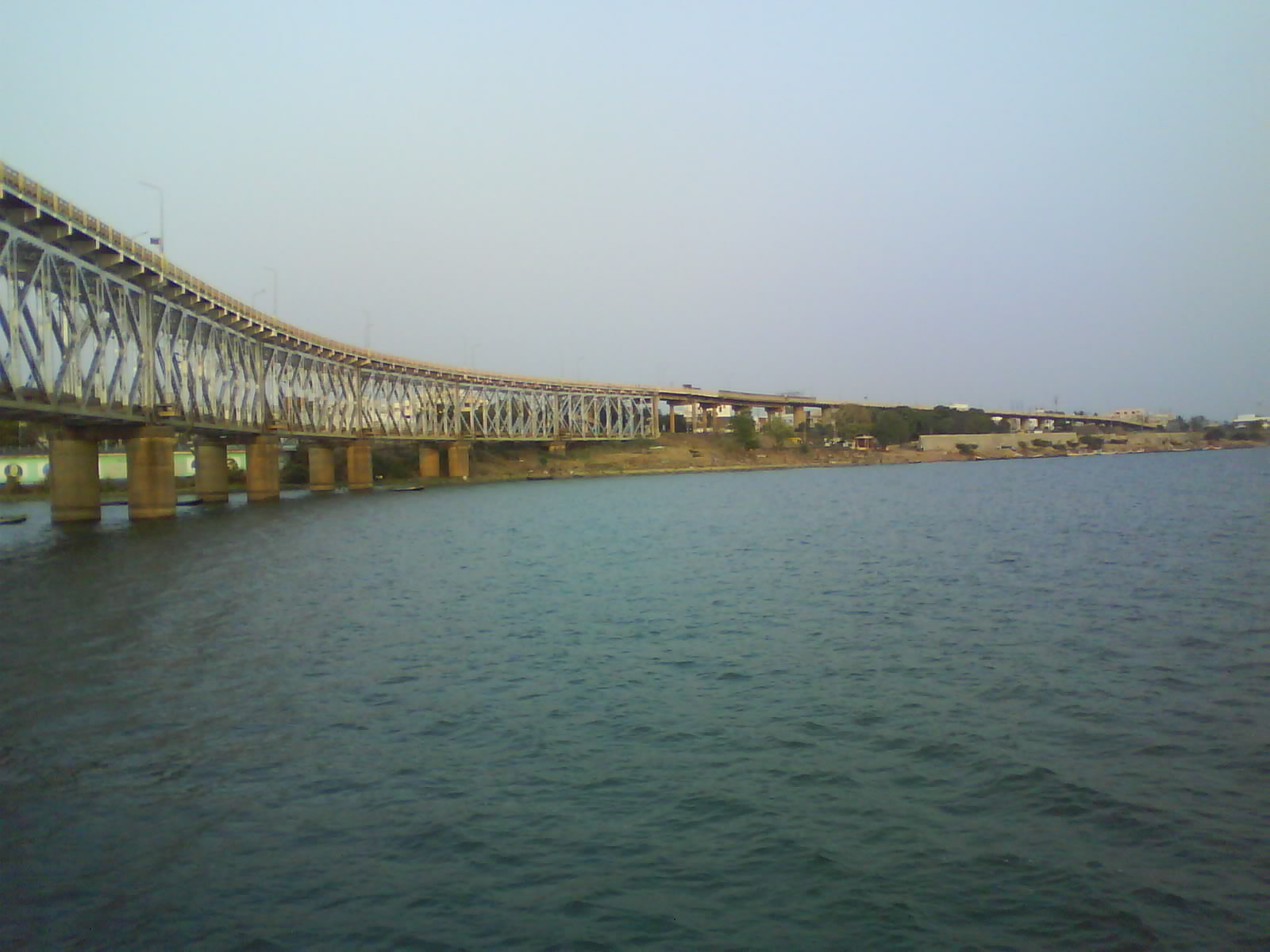
Starting of the bridge. Notice the elevated road going over the bridge to join it.

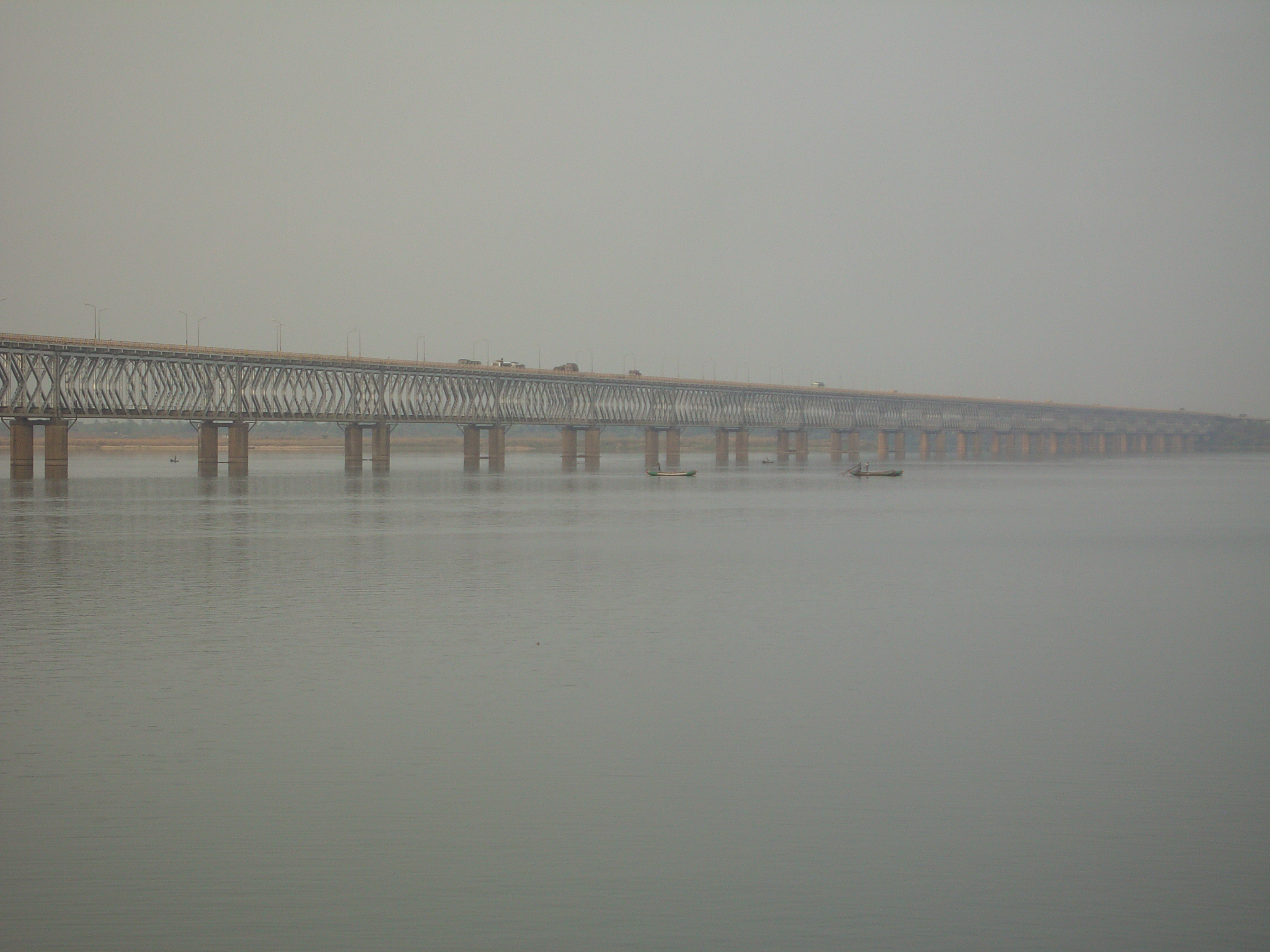
Stretch of Godavari Bridge. This is only the half of the bridge
