= Godavari River =

River in south-central India

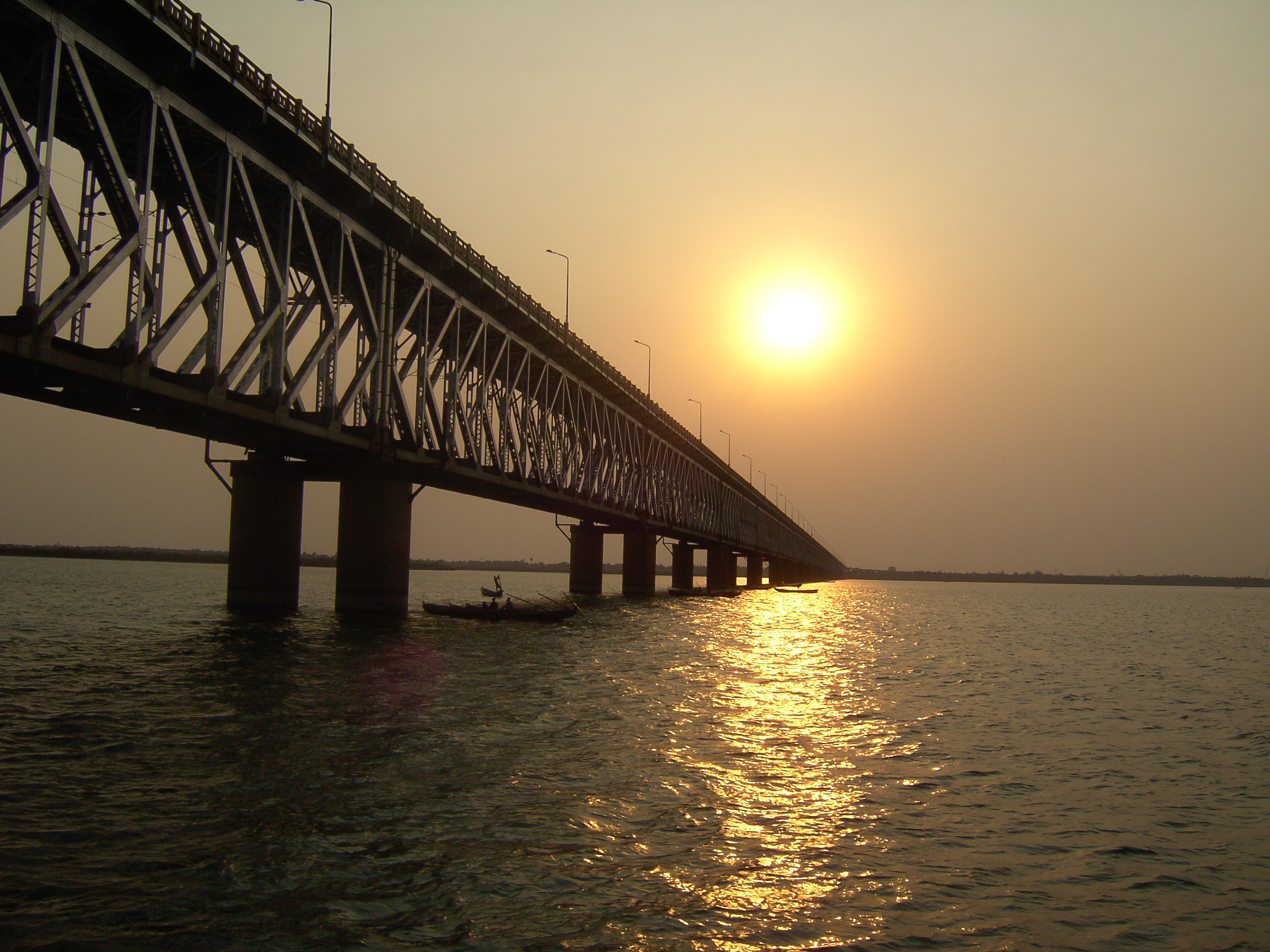
- The Godavari bridge across the Godavari in Rajahmundry at East Godavari district

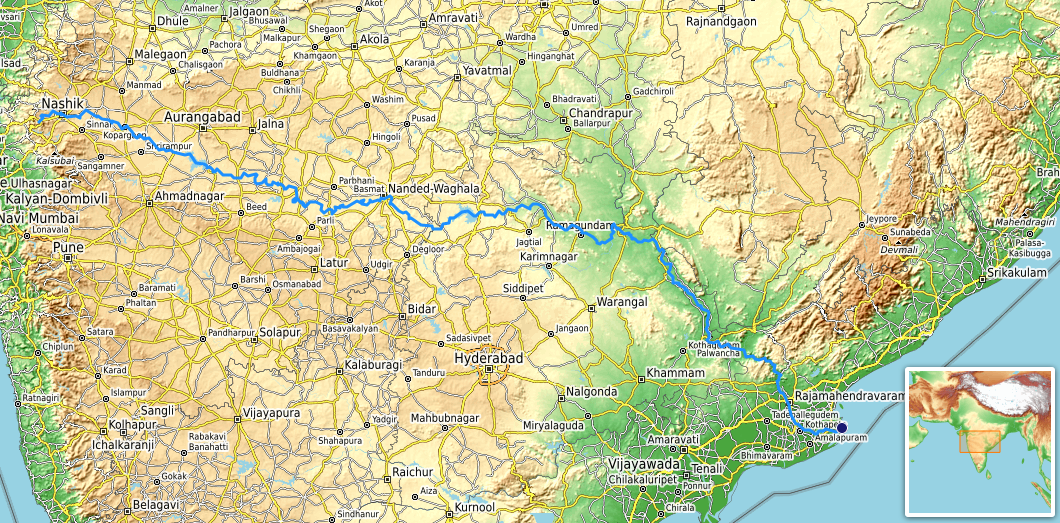
- Path of the Godavari through the South Indian Peninsula

Location
- Country: India
- State: Maharashtra, Telangana, Andhra Pradesh, Chhattisgarh, Odisha
- Region: West India and South India

Physical characteristics
- Source
  - location: Brahmagiri Mountain, Trimbakeshwar, Nashik, Maharashtra, India
  - coordinates: 19°55′48″N 73°31′39″E
  - elevation: 920 m (3,020 ft)
- Mouth: Bay of Bengal
  - location: Antarvedi, Konaseema district Andhra Pradesh, India
  - coordinates: 17°0′N 81°48′E
  - elevation: 0 m (0 ft)
- Length: 1,465 km (910 mi)
- Basin size: 312,812 km^{2} (120,777 sq mi)
- Discharge
  - location: Godavari Delta, Bay of Bengal
  - average: 3,505 m^{3}/s (123,800 cu ft/s)
- Discharge
  - location: Rajahmundry (80 km upstream of mouth; Basin size: 308,946 km^{2} (119,285 sq mi)
  - average: (Period: 1998/01/01–2023/12/31)3,740.5 m^{3}/s (132,090 cu ft/s)
  - minimum: 79 m^{3}/s (2,800 cu ft/s)
  - maximum: 12,045 m^{3}/s (425,400 cu ft/s)
- Discharge
  - location: Polavaram (1901–1979)
  - average: 3,061.18 m^{3}/s (108,105 cu ft/s)
  - minimum: 7 m^{3}/s (250 cu ft/s)
  - maximum: 34,606 m^{3}/s (1,222,100 cu ft/s)

Basin features
- Tributaries
  - left: Banganga, Kadva, Shivana, Purna, Kadam, Pranahita, Indravati, Taliperu, Sabari
  - right: Nasardi, Pravara, Sindphana, Manjira, Manair, Kinnerasani

The Godavari (IAST: Godāvarī, IPA: [ɡoːd̪ɑːʋɐɾiː]) is India's second longest river after the Ganges River, and drains the third largest basin in India, covering about 10% of the total geographical area. Its source is in Trimbakeshwar, Nashik, Maharashtra. It flows east for 1,465 kilometres (910 mi), draining the states of Maharashtra (48.6%), Telangana (18.8%), Andhra Pradesh (4.5%), Chhattisgarh (10.9%), and Odisha (5.7%). The river ultimately empties into the Bay of Bengal through an extensive network of distributaries. Its 312,812 km^{2} (120,777 sq mi) drainage basin is one of the largest in the Indian subcontinent, with only the Ganga and Indus rivers having a larger drainage basin. In terms of length, catchment area and discharge, the Godavari is the largest in peninsular India, and had been dubbed as the Dakshina Ganga (Southern Ganges).

In the past few decades, the river has been barricaded by several barrages and dams, keeping a head of water (depth) which lowers evaporation. Its broad river delta houses 729 persons/km^{2} – nearly twice the Indian average population density and has a substantial risk of flooding, which in lower parts would be exacerbated if the global sea level were to rise.

== Course ==
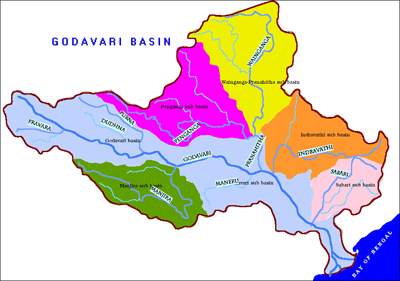
Godavari River basin.

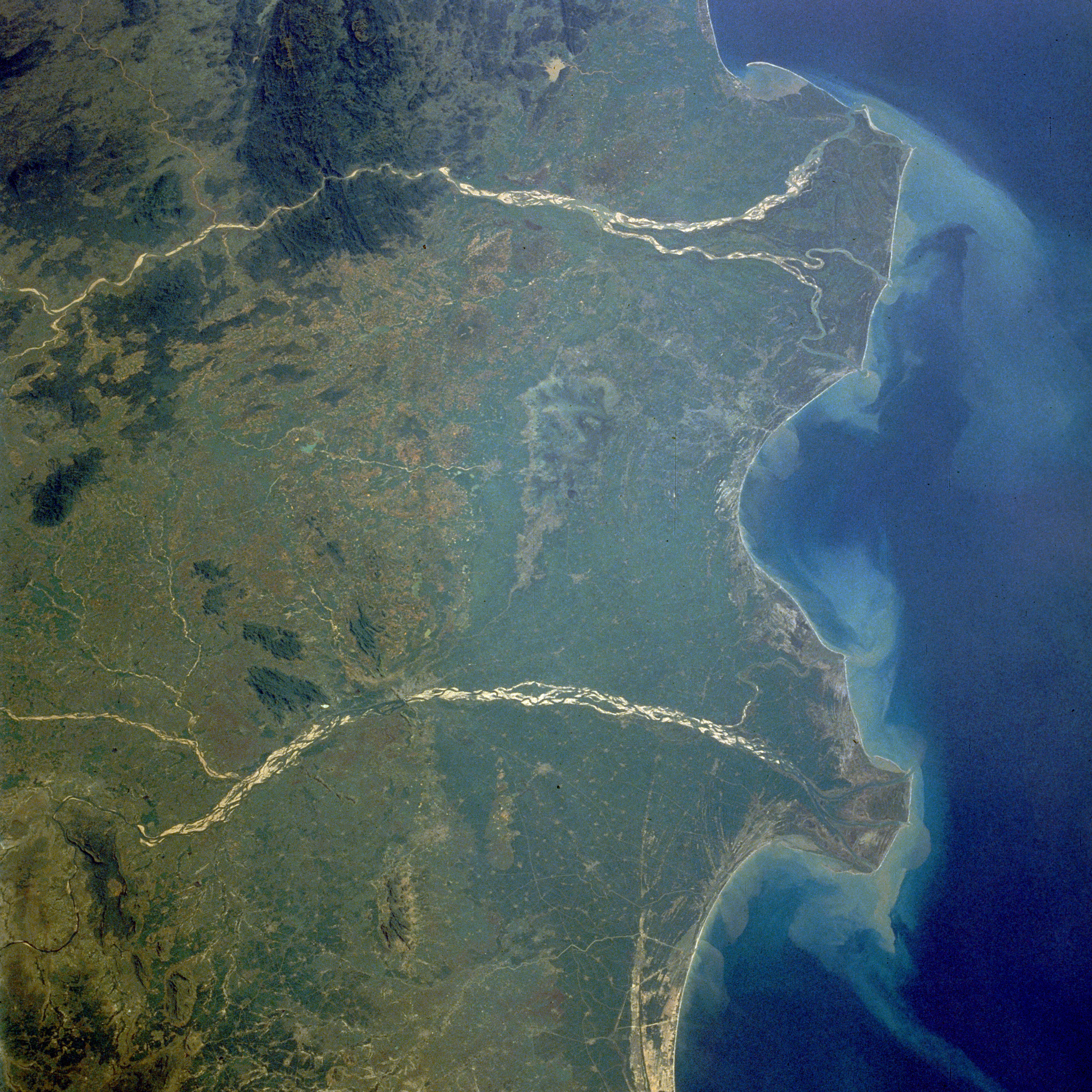
Godavari River delta extending into the Bay of Bengal (upper river in image).

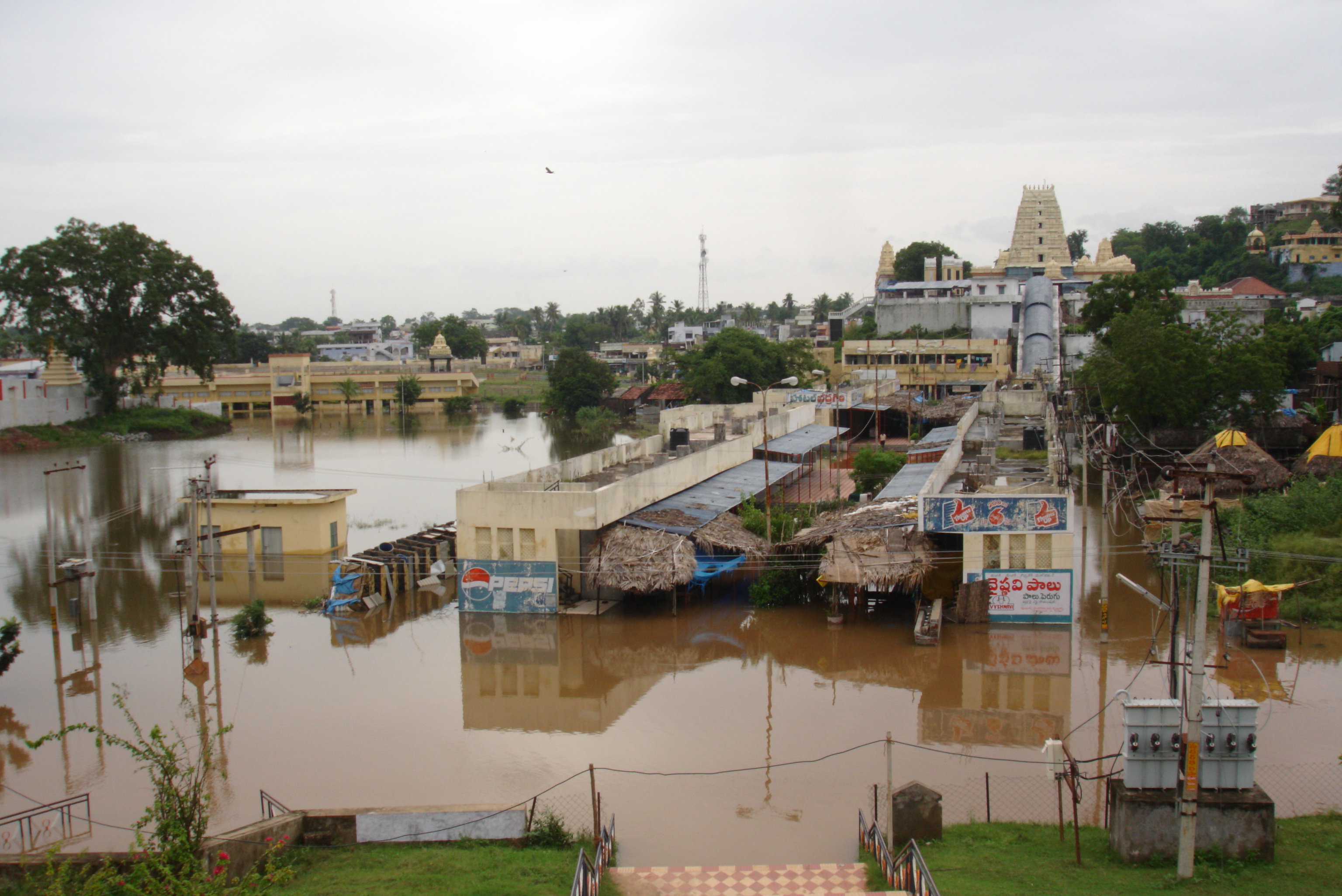
Bhadrachalam Temple during 2005 floods

The Godavari originates in the Western Ghats of central India, near Nashik in Maharashtra, 80 km (50 mi) from the Arabian Sea. It flows for 1,465 km (910 mi), first eastwards across the Deccan Plateau, then turns southeast, entering the Eluru district and Alluri Sitharama Raju district of Andhra Pradesh, until it splits into two distributaries that widen into a large river delta at Dhavaleshwaram Barrage, in Rajamahendravaram, and then flows into the Bay of Bengal.

The Godavari River has a coverage area of 312,812 km^{2} (120,777 sq mi), which is nearly one-tenth of the area of India and is equivalent to the area of the United Kingdom and Republic of Ireland put together. The river basin is considered to be divided into 3 sections:

- Upper (source to the confluence with Manjira),
- Middle (between confluence of Manjira and Pranhita) and
- Lower (Pranhita confluence to mouth).

These put together account for 24.2% of the total basin area. The rivers annual average water inflows are nearly 110 billion cubic metres. Nearly 50% of the water availability is being harnessed. The water allocation from the river among the riparian states are governed by the Godavari Water Disputes Tribunal. The river has highest flood flows in India and experienced recorded flood of 3.6 million cusecs in the year 1986 and annual flood of 1.0 million cusecs is normal.

=== Within Maharashtra ===
The river originates in Maharashtra state and has an extensive course. The upper basin (origin to its confluence with Manjira), of which lies entirely within the state, cumulatively draining an area as large as 152,199 km^{2} (58,764 sq mi) – about half the area of Maharashtra. Within Nashik district, the river assumes a north-easterly course until it flows into the Gangapur Reservoir, created by a dam of the same name. The reservoir along with the Kashypi Dam, provides potable water to Nashik, one of the largest cities located on its banks. The river, as it emerges through the dam, some 8 km (5.0 mi) upstream from Nashik, flows on a rocky bed, undulated by a series of chasms and rocky ledges, resulting in the formation of two significant waterfalls – the Gangapur and the Someshwar waterfalls. The latter, located at Someshwar, is more popularly known as the Dudhsagar Waterfall. About 10 km (6.2 mi) east of Gangapur, the river passes the town of Nashik, where it collects its effluents in the form of the river Nandini on its right bank.

About 0.5 km (0.31 mi) south of Nashik, the river bends sharply to the east, washing the base of a high cliff formerly the site of a Mughal fort, but which is now being eroded away by the action of floods. About 25 km (16 mi) below Nashik is the confluence of the Godavari and one of its tributaries, the Darna. The stream occupies, for nine months in the year, a small space in a wide and gravelly bed, the greyish banks being 4 to 6 m (13 to 20 ft) high, topped with a deep layer of black soil. A few kilometres after its meeting with the Darna, the Godavari swerves to the north-east, before the Banganga, from the north-west, meets it on the left. The course of the main stream then tends more decidedly south. At Nandur-Madhmeshwar, the Kadva, a second large affluent, brings considerable increase to the waters of the Godavari. The river begins its southeasterly course characteristic of rivers of the Deccan Plateau. The river exits the Niphad Taluka of Nashik and enters the Kopargaon taluka, Ahmednagar District. Within Ahmednagar District the river quickly completes its short course, flowing alongside the town of Kopargaon and reaching Puntamba. Beyond this, the river serves as a natural boundary between the following districts:

- Ahmednagar and Aurangabad: Along the boundary here, it receives its first major tributary the Pravara River, draining the former district. The confluence is located at Pravarasangam. By virtue of a sub-tributary of Pravara – Mandohol, which originates in Pune District – the basin impinges the Pune district. The river at Paithan has been impounded by the Jayakwadi Dam forming the NathSagar Reservoir. Kalsubai located in Godavari basin, is the highest peak in Maharashtra.
- Beed and Jalna
- Beed and Parbhani: Located along here is its merger with Sindphana, an important tributary which drains a considerably large area within Beed. The sub-tributary river Bindusara forms a landmark at Beed.

The river beyond, near the village Sonpeth, flows into Parbhani. In Parbhani district, the river flows through Gangakhed taluka. As mentioned above, the Godavari is also called Dakshinganga so the city is called as Gangakhed (meaning a village on the bank of Ganga). As per Hindu rituals this place is considered quite important for after death peace to flow ashes into the river.

Its course is relatively non-significant except for receiving two smaller streams – Indrayani and Masuli – merging at its left and right banks, respectively. Within the last taluka of the district Parbhani, Purna, the river drains a major tributary of the same name: Purna.

It then exits into the neighbouring district of Nanded where 10 km (6.2 mi) before reaching the town Nanded, it is impounded by the Vishnupuri Dam and thus with it, bringing Asia's largest lift irrigation projects to life. A little downstream from Nanded, the river receives Asna, a small stream, on its left bank. It then runs into the controversial Babli project soon ends its course within Maharashtra, albeit temporarily, at its merger with a major tributary – Manjira.

The river after flowing into Telangana, re-emerges to run as a state boundary separating the Mancherial, Telangana from Gadchiroli, Maharashtra. At the state border, it runs between Sironcha and Somnoor Sangam receiving one tributary at each of those nodal points – the Pranhita and subsequently the Indravati.

=== Within Telangana ===
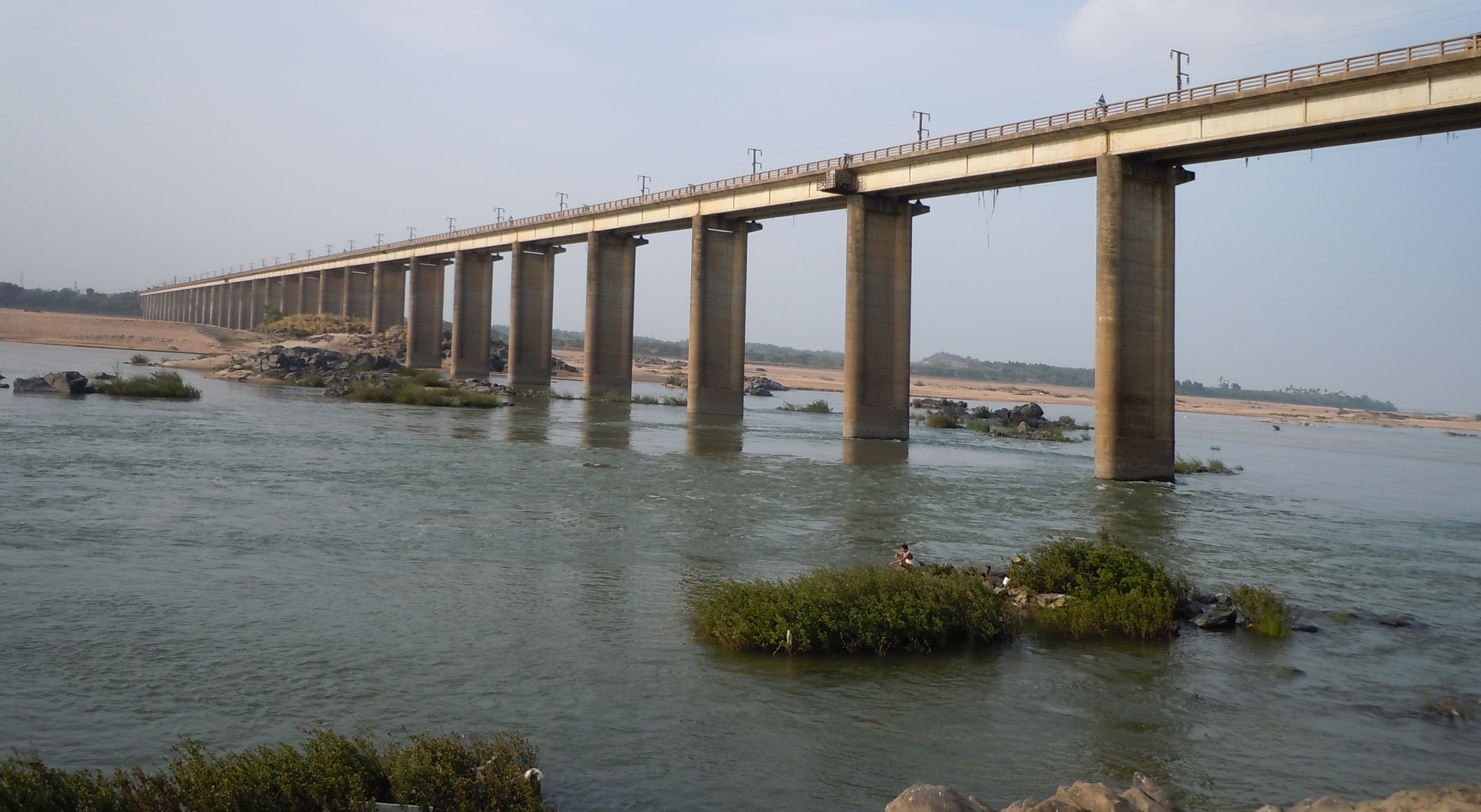
Road bridge over Godavari River at Bhadrachalam

Godavari enters into Telangana in Nizamabad district at Kandakurthy where Manjira, Haridra rivers joins Godavari and forms Triveni Sangamam. The river flows along the border between Nirmal and Mancherial districts in the north and Nizamabad, Jagtial, Peddapalli districts to its south. About 12 km (7.5 mi) after entering Telangana it merges with the back waters of the Sriram Sagar Dam. The river after emerging through the dam gates, enjoys a wide river bed, often splitting to encase sandy islands. The river receives a minor but significant tributary Kadam river. It then emerges at its eastern side to act as a state border with Maharashtra only to later enter into Bhadradri Kothagudem district. In this district, the river flows through an important Hindu pilgrimage town – Bhadrachalam.

The river further swells after receiving a minor tributary Kinnerasani River and exits into Andhra Pradesh.

=== Within Andhra Pradesh ===
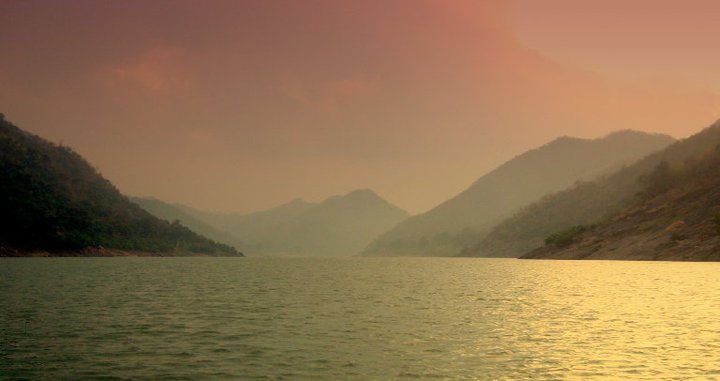
The river at Papi Hills near Rajamahendravaram in Andhra Pradesh.

Within the state of Andhra Pradesh, the river flows through hilly terrain of the Eastern Ghats known as the Papi hills which explains the narrowing of its bed as it flows through a gorge for a few km, only to re-widen at Polavaram. The deepest bed level of a submarine plunge pool in Godavari River, located 36 km upstream of Polavaram dam, is at 45 meters below the sea level. Before crossing the Papi hills, it receives its last major tributary Sabari River on its left bank. The river upon reaching the plains begins to widen out until it reaches Rajamahendravaram. Arma Konda (1,680 m (5,510 ft)) is the highest peak in the Godavari river basin as well as in the Eastern Ghats.

Dowleswaram Barrage was constructed across the river in Rajamahendravaram. At Rajamahendravaram, the Godavari splits into two large branches which are called Gautami (Gautami Godavari) and Vasishta Godavari and five smaller branches. Similarly, the Vasishta splits into two branches named Vasishta and Vainateya. These four branches which join the Bay of Bengal at different places, form a delta of length 170 km (110 mi) along the coast of the Bay of Bengal and is called the Konaseema region. This delta along with the delta of the Krishna River is called the Rice Granary of South India.

=== Within Puducherry ===
The Gautami which is the largest branch of the whole passes along Yanam enclave of Union territory of Puducherry and empties into sea at Point Godavery. In fact, Yanam is bounded on south by Gautami branch and the Coringa River originates at Yanam which merges into the sea near Coringa village in Andhra Pradesh.

== Discharge ==
Mean annual, minimum and maximum discharge (Q – m^{3}/s) at Rajahmundry (period from 1998/01/01 to 2023/12/31):

Year	Discharge (m^{3}/s)			Year	Discharge (m^{3}/s)		
Year	Min	Mean	Max	Year	Min	Mean	Max
1998	900	3,863	8,018	2011	2,325	4,969	8,875
1999	552	3,411	7,901	2012	878	3,198	6,184
2000	732	3,052	6,732	2013	1,099	3,681	7,327
2001	79	2,378	6,525	2014	455	2,564	5,363
2002	774	3,360	6,413	2015	761	2,297	4,353
2003	2,070	5,114	8,571	2016	1,019	2,401	4,802
2004	2,764	5,142	8,039	2017	847	2,415	4,633
2005	1,368	4,162	8,100	2018	981	2,791	5,537
2006	988	3,097	6,753	2019	496	2,625	5,791
2007	1,361	3,674	6,703	2020	1,575	3,061	6,492
2008	969	3,594	6,753	2021	1,225	3,706	7,147
2009	2,111	4,669	7,436	2022	1,193	4,950	9,430
2010	2,534	6,355	10,403	2023	2,570	6,599	12,045
1998–2023					1,255	3,740	7,127

== Tributaries ==
The major left bank tributaries include the Purna, Pranhita, Indravati, and Sabari River, covering nearly 59.7% of the total catchment area of the basin. The right bank tributaries Pravara, Manjira, and Manair contribute 16.1% of the basin.

The Pranhita River is the largest tributary of the Godavari River, covering about 34% of its drainage basin. Though the river proper flows only for 113 km (70 mi), by virtue of its extensive tributaries Wardha, Wainganga, Penganga, the sub-basin drains all of Vidharba region as well as the southern slopes of the Satpura Ranges. Indravati is the 2nd largest tributary, known as the "lifeline" of the Kalahandi, Nabarangapur of Odisha and Bastar district of Chhattisgarh. Due to their enormous sub-basins both Indravati and Pranhita are considered rivers in their own right. Manjira is the longest tributary and holds the Nizam Sagar reservoir. Purna is a prime river in the water scarce Marathwada region of Maharashtra.

Drainage basin of the Godavari
1. Upper, middle, and lower basins of the Godavari (24.2%)
2. Pranhita (34.9%)
3. Indravati (13.0%)
4. Manjira (9.86%)
5. Sabari (6.53%)
6. Purna (4.98%)
7. Manair (4.18%)
8. Pravara (2.08%)

Major tributaries of the Godavari river
Tributary	Bank	Confluence location	Confluence elevation	Length	Sub-basin area
Pravara	Right	Pravara Sangam, Nevasa, Ahmednagar, Maharashtra	463 m (1,519 ft)	208 km (129 mi)	6,537 km^{2} (2,524 sq mi)
Purna	Left	Jambulbet, Parbhani, Marathwada, Maharashtra	358 m (1,175 ft)	373 km (232 mi)	15,579 km^{2} (6,015 sq mi)
Manjira	Right	Kandakurthi, Renjal, Nizamabad, Telangana	332 m (1,089 ft)	724 km (450 mi)	30,844 km^{2} (11,909 sq mi)
Manair	Right	Arenda, Manthani, Peddapalli, Telangana	115 m (377 ft)	225 km (140 mi)	13,106 km^{2} (5,060 sq mi)
Pranhita	Left	Kaleshwaram, Mahadevpur, Jayashankar Bhupalpally, Telangana	99 m (325 ft)	113 km (70 mi)	109,078 km^{2} (42,115 sq mi)
Indravati	Left	Somnoor Sangam, Sironcha, Gadchiroli, Maharashtra	82 m (269 ft)	535 km (332 mi)	41,655 km^{2} (16,083 sq mi)
Sabari	Left	Kunawaram, Alluri Sitharama Raju district, Andhra Pradesh	25 m (82 ft)	418 km (260 mi)	20,427 km^{2} (7,887 sq mi)

Other than these seven principal tributaries, it has many smaller but significant ones draining into it. Indravati river floodwaters overflow into the Jouranala which is part of Sabari basin. A barrage at 19°7′19″N 82°14′9″E is constructed across the Indravati river to divert Indravati water in to Sabari river for enhanced hydropower generation.

=== Seven mouths of Godavari ===
Before merging into the Bay of Bengal, the Godavari has seven mouths in total and is considered sacred by local Hindus. As per their traditional belief, the holy waters of the Godavari are said to have been brought from the head of Shiva by the Rishi Gautama, and the seven branches by which it is traditionally supposed to have reached the sea are said to have been made by seven great rishis known as Sapta Rishis. Thus, they are named after these seven great rishis and are named as Tulyabhāga (Tulya or Kaśyapa), Ātreya (Atri), Gautamī (Gautama), Jamadagni (now replaced by Vṛddhagautamī i.e. Old Gautami), Bhardvāja (Bharadvaja), Kauśika (Visvamitra) and Vaśișțha (Vasishtha). So bathing in these mouths are considered an act of great religious efficacy by native Hindus. These mouths are remembered by a Sanskrit sloka as follow:

tulyātreyī bharadvāja gautamī vṛddhagautamī
kauśikīca vaśiṣṭhaaca tathā sāgaraṃ gataḥ

(Godavari becomes) Tulya, Ātreyi, Bharadvāja, Gautamī, Vṛddhagautamī,
Kauśikī and Vaśiṣṭhaa and then passes into sea. (Note: तुल्यात्रेयी भरद्वाज गौतमी वृद्धगौतमी । कौशिकीच वशिष्ठाच तथा सागरं गतः॥)

Together they are referred as Sapta Godavari and the Godavari river before splitting is referred as Akhanda Godavari. However, there exists another eight mouth named as Vainateyam, which is not one of these traditional seven mouths and is supposed to have been created by a rishi of that name who stole a part of Vasisththa branch. Godavari was frequently referred as Ganga or Ganges by ancient Indian writings. However, the original branches of Kauśika, Bhardwaja and Jamadagni do not exist any longer and pilgrims bathe in the sea at locations where they are believed to have been. The traditional Bharadwāja mouth is in Tirthālamondi (now bordering Savithri Nagar of Yanam and before a Hamlet of Guttenadivi) and the traditional Kauśika mouth is located at Rameswaram, a hamlet of Samathakurru village in Allavaram Mandal of Konaseema district. Since the location of thr original mouth of Jamadagni is no longer known, pilgrims instead perform ritual bathing in the Vriddha Gautami branch at Kundaleswaram village in Katrenikona Mandal of Konaseema district. There is a local legend saying the Injaram and Patha (Old) Injaram (now on the other bank of Gautami river within Island Polavalam mandal of Konaseema district) were split by Godavari river. Thus the Godavari passing between these two now referred as Gautami and the old passage being referred as Vriddha Gautami. In early British records, the Injaram Paragana (district) was counted along with Muramalla village (now located on the other side of Gautami within Island Polavalam mandal) and said to have comprised 22 villages.

== Religious significance ==
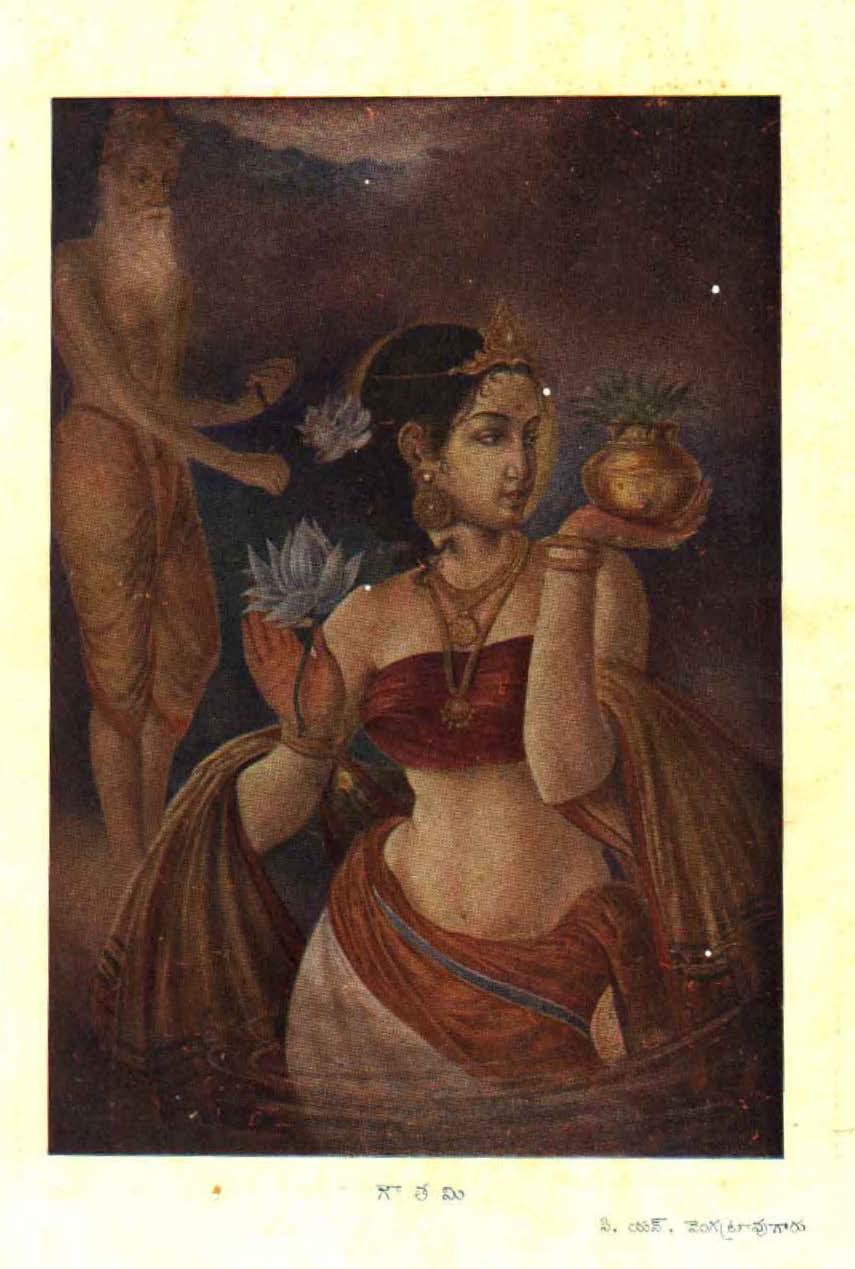
Gautami personified with Gautama.

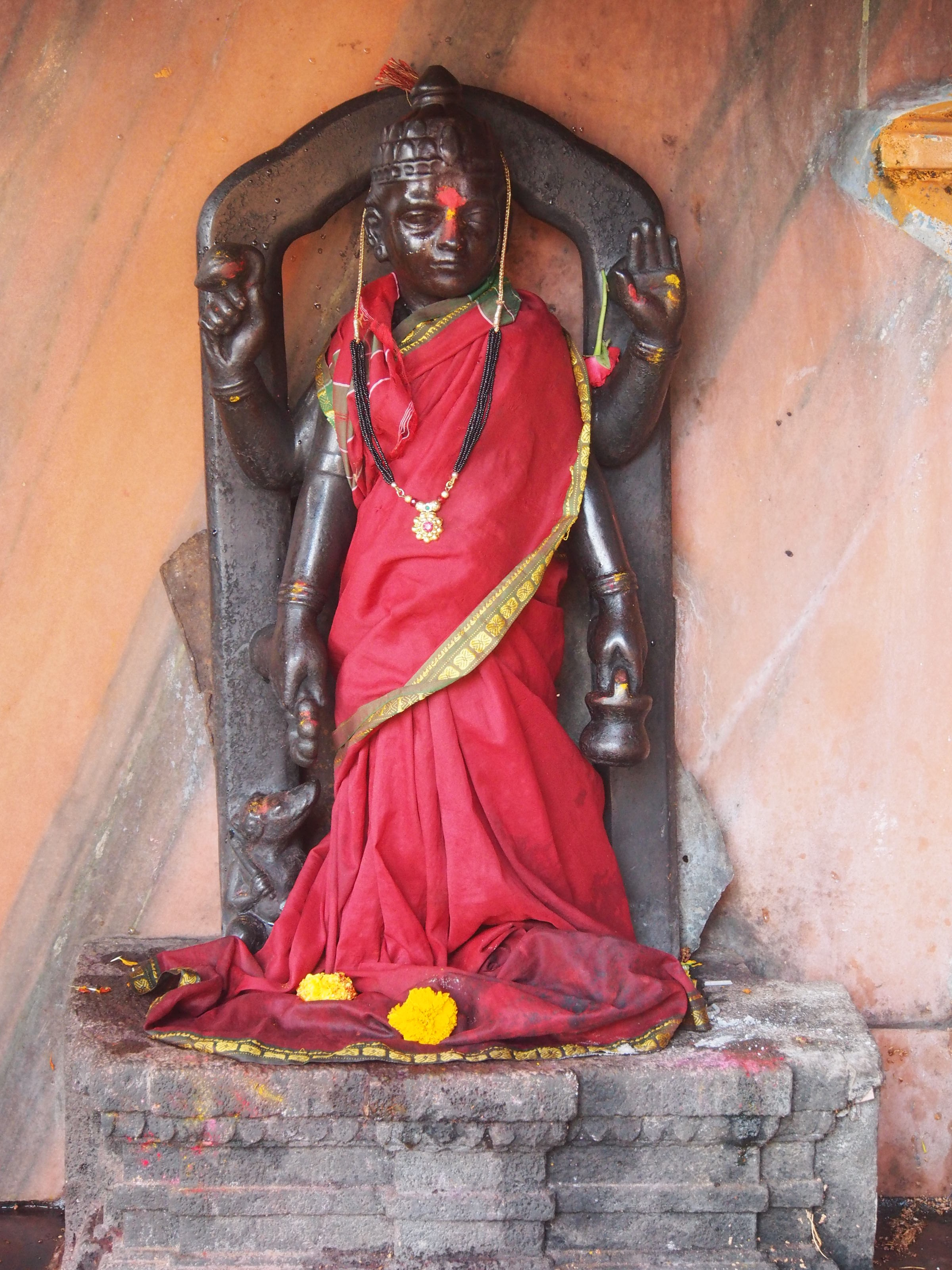
Godavari Statue at Gangadwar, worshiped as origin of Godavari, Triambak

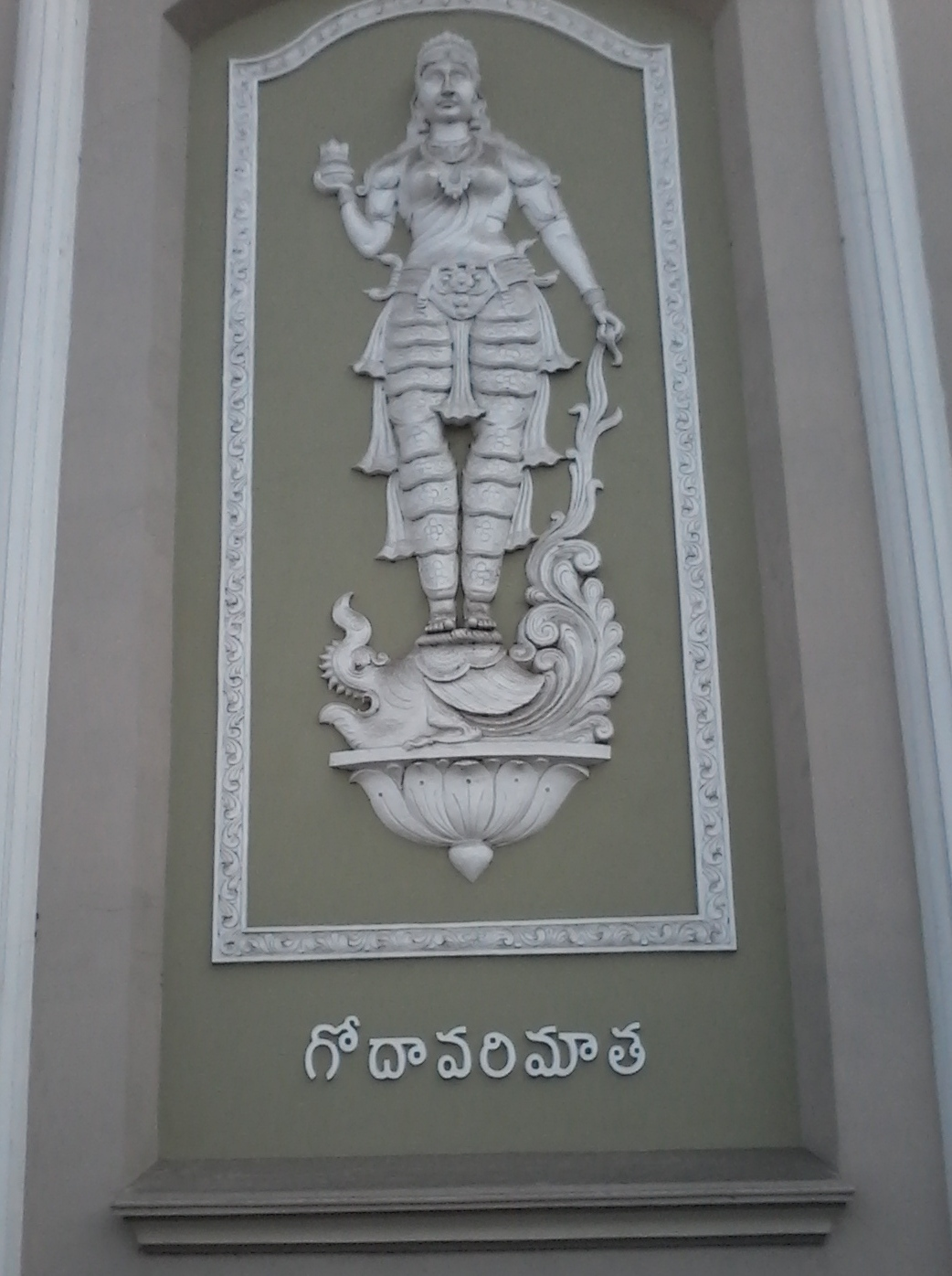
Goddess Godavari

The river is sacred to Hindus and has several places on its banks that have been places of pilgrimage for thousands of years. Amongst the huge numbers of people who have bathed in her waters as a rite of cleansing are said to have been the deity Baladeva 5000 years ago and the saint Chaitanya Mahaprabhu 500 years ago. Every twelve years, the Pushkaram fair is held on the banks of the river.

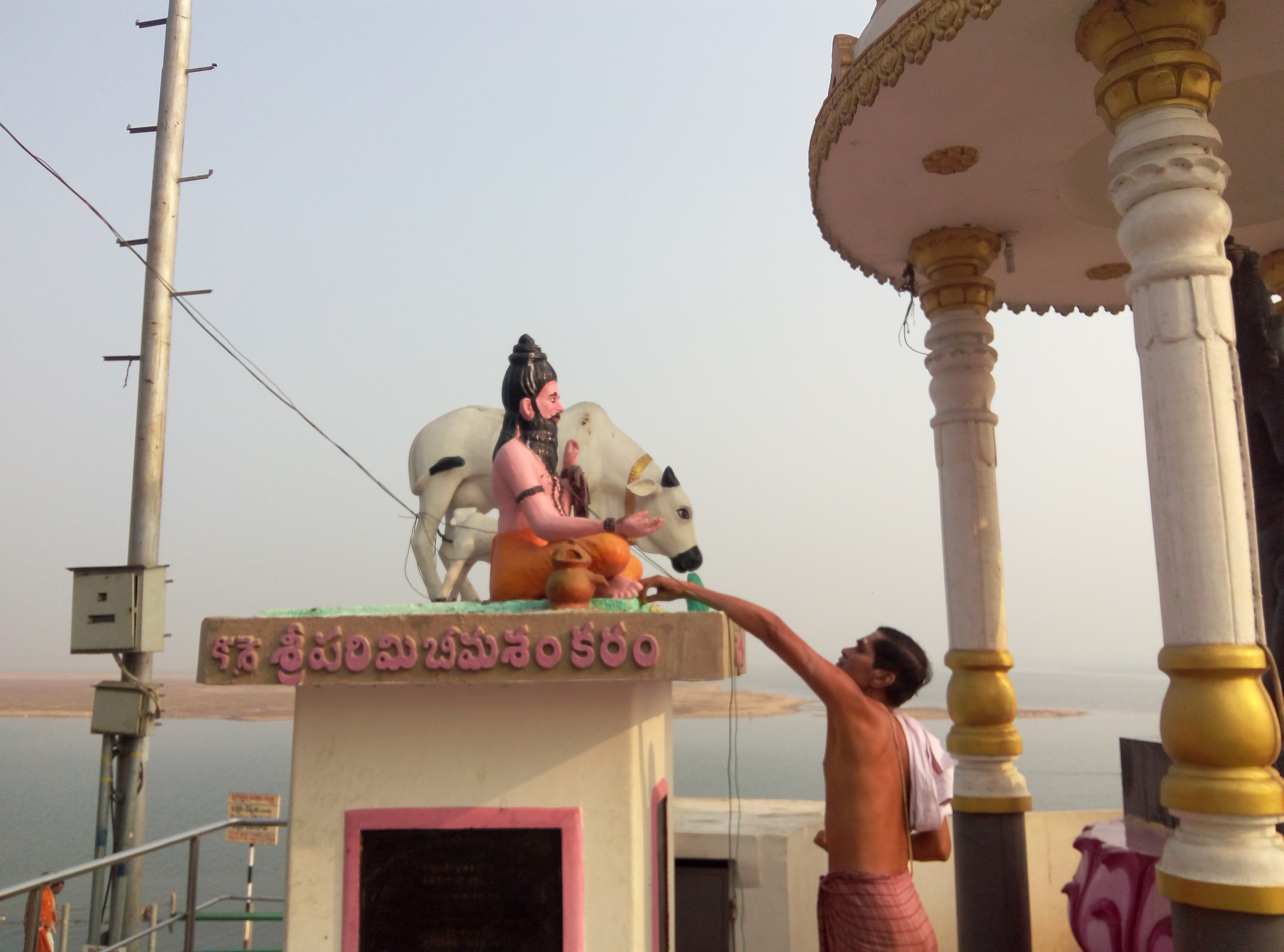
Sculpture depicting govu vatsa and gowthama legend about birth of Godavari River

A legend has it that the sage Gautama lived in the Brahmagiri Hills at Tryambakeshwar with his wife Ahalya. The couple lived the rest of their lives in the then village called Govuru, now known as Kovvur ("cow") since British rule. Ahalya lived in a nearby place called Thagami (now Thogummi). The sage, as a reason for the practice of annadanam ("giving away food" to the needy), started cultivating rice crops and other crops. Once, the god Ganesha, on the wish of the sages, sent a miraculous cow mayadhenu, which resembled a normal cow. It entered the sage's abode and started spoiling the rice while he was meditating. Since cattle is sacred to Hindus and treated with respect, he put the darbha grass on the cow. But, to his surprise, it fell dead. Seeing what happened before their eyes, the sages and their wives cried out, "We thought that Gautama-maharishi is a righteous man, but he committed bovicide (killing of a cow or cattle)!". The sage wished to atone for this grievous sin. Therefore, he went to Nashik and observed tapas (penance) to propitiate Tryambakeshvara (a manifestation of the god Shiva), on the advice of the sages, praying for atonement and asking him to make the Ganges flow over the cow. Shiva was pleased with the sage and diverted the Ganges, which washed away the cow and gave rise to the Godavari River in Nashik. The water stream flowed past Kovvur and ultimately merged with the Bay of Bengal.

=== Sapta Sāgara Yatra ===
In olden days a pilgrimage named as sapta sāgara yātra was made by those desirous of offspring along the banks of the holy waters from the seven mouths. It starts with holy bathing at Tulyabhaga river at Chollangi village on Amavasya during Krishna Paksha of Pushya month as per Hindu calendar. That day is locally referred as Chollangi Amavasya. That place where the river branch merges with sea is referred as Tulya Sāgara Sangamam. Secondly, they take bath in Coringa village in the Coringa river which is considered as Atreya branch of Godavari and the holy bathing place is called as Atreya Sāgara Sangamam. After bathing at different banks of the other branches the pilgrimage ends by bathing near Narsapuram or Antarvedi.

== Settlements along the Godavari ==
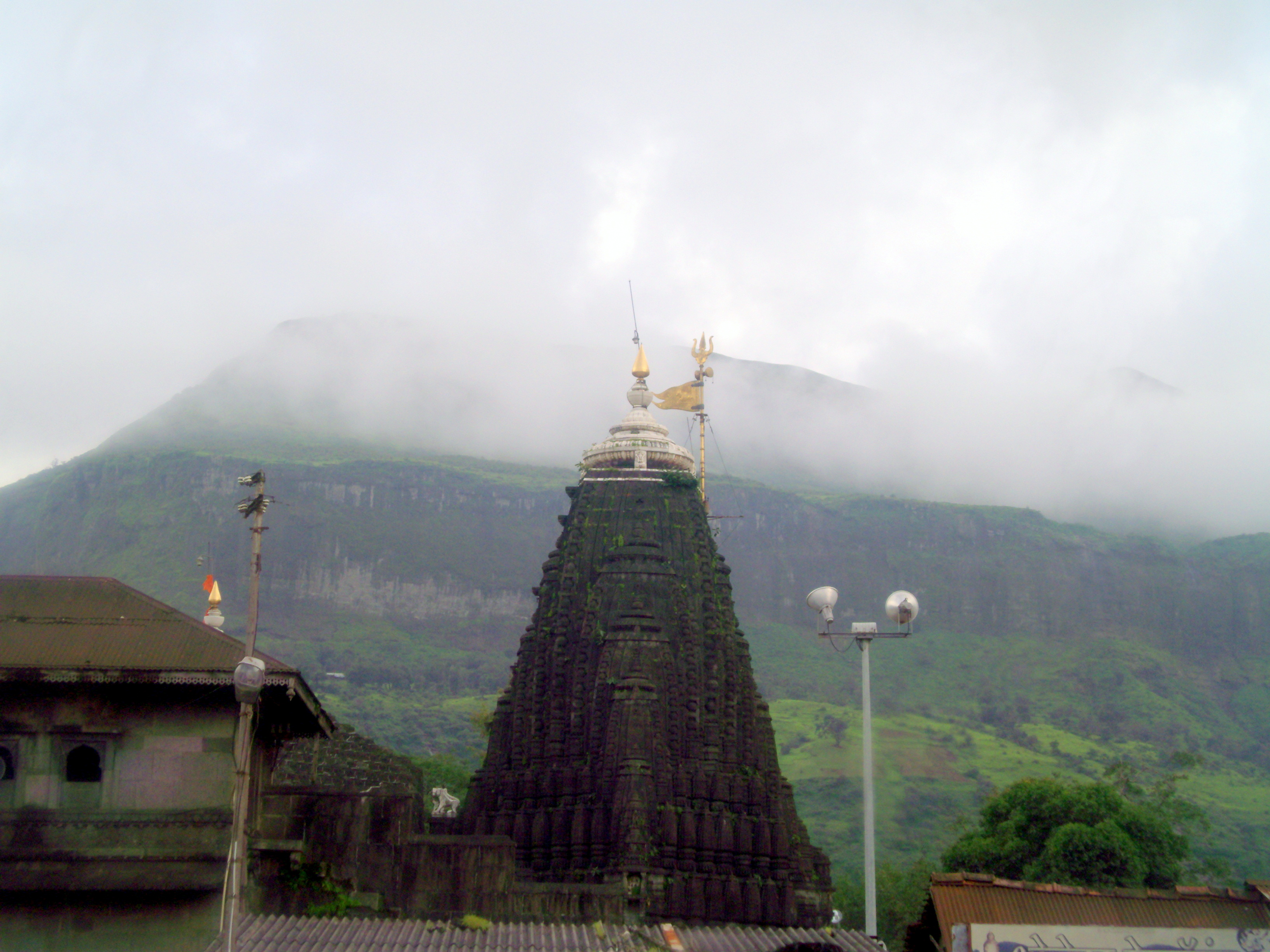
Trimbakeshwar

=== Maharashtra ===
- Nashik (Holy city and site of Simhastha Kumbha Mela bathing festivals)
- Trimbakeshwar (shrine to the Jyotirlinga of the god Shiva)
- Kopargaon
- Puntamba – A place of pilgrimage with several ancient temples including the last resting place (Samadhi) of Sant Changdev in Puntamba. This town is located in Rahata Taluka of Ahmednagar district and 18 km from holy place of Sai Baba of Shirdi. A temple attributed to Kartikeya (younger son of Shiva) is located here on bank of river Godavari). River godavari which had entered in kopargaon taluka of Ahmednagar from Niphad taluka of Nashik is the natural frontier between Aurangabad and Ahmednagar districts of Maharashtra onwards until it enters in confluence with river Pravara at Pravarasangam village which comes under Newasa taluka a town where famous Bhakti saint Shree sant Dhnyaneshwar had written critic on Bhagavatgeeta 'Dhnyaneshwari'.
- Paithan (ancient capital of the Satavahana dynasty)
- Gangakhed
- Nanded (location of the Hazur Sahib Nanded Sikh Gurdwara)
- Sironcha (town situated near the confluence of Godavari and Pranahita rivers)

=== Telangana ===
Kaleshwara Mukteswara Swamy Temple

- Basara, Nirmal district (Gnana Saraswati Temple)
- Goodem gutta, Adilabad (temple) Luxettipet, Adilabad
- Mancherial, Mancherial
- Godavarikhani, Ramagundam
- Nirmal, Nirmal district (Nirmal toys)
- Chennur, Adilabad
- Tadpakal, Nizamabad district (Armoor toys)
- Battapur, Nizamabad district (Armoor toys)
- Dharmapuri, Jagtial district
- Godavarikhani, Ramagundam, Sripada Yellampalli Project
- Manthani, Peddapalli district (Gautameshwara Swami (Shiva) temple, Rama, Saraswati temples)
- Kaleshwaram, Jayashankar Bhupalpally district (Kaleswara Mukhteswara Swamy (Shiva) temple)
- Mahadevpur Jayashankar Bhupalpally district
- Eturnagaram, Jayashankar Bhupalpally district
- Manuguru, Bhadradri Kothagudem district
- Bhadrachalam, Bhadradri Kothagudem district

=== Andhra Pradesh ===
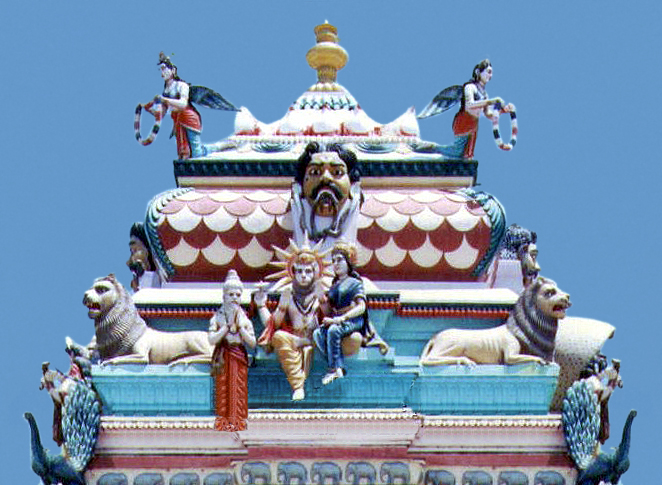
Antarvedi temple

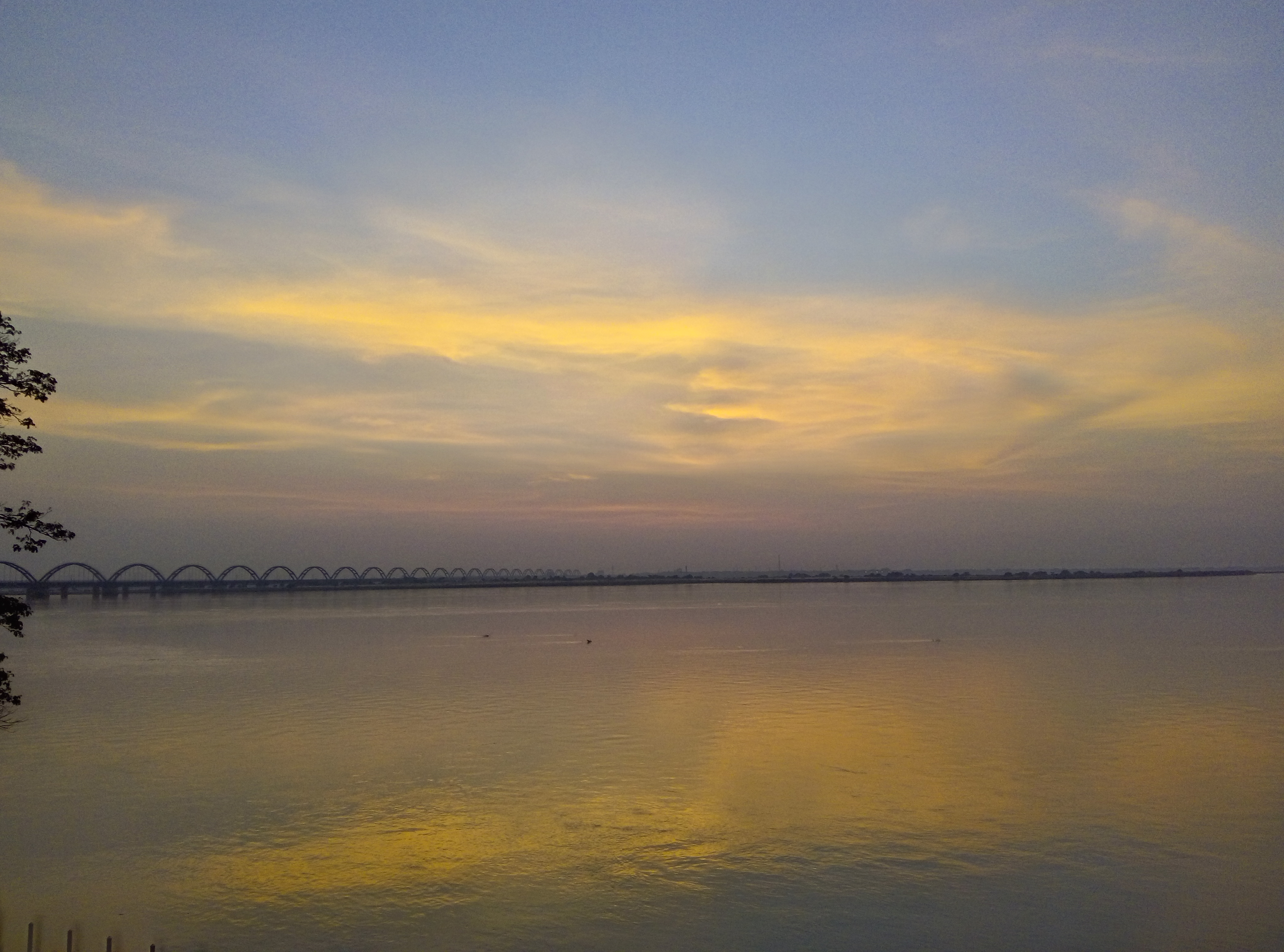
Sunset view of Godavari River and bridge from Rajahmundry

- Polavaram, Eluru district (Sri Bhadrakalisametha Sri Veereswara Swami temple)
- Rajamahendravaram, East Godavari (where the Akhanda Godavari splits into two streams called "Gautami" and "Vashista" before joining Bay of Bengal)
- Kovvur, East Godavari district
- Ravulapalem, Konaseema district
- Kothapeta, Konaseema district
- Mukteswaram, Dr. B.R. Ambedkar Konaseema district (Sri Kshana Muktheswara Swamy temple)
- Kotipalli, Konaseema district (Sri Someswara Swamy temple)
- Antarvedi, Konaseema district (Antarvedi is famous for the Sri Laxmi Narasimha Swamy temple constructed between the 15th and 16th centuries. There is also a temple of Shiva that is older than Narasimha Swamy temple. The temple's idol of Shiva was installed by Rama.)
- Narasapuram, West Godavari district

=== Puducherry ===
- Yanam district (Yanam is an enclave located in East Godavari district, where the Gautami joins the Bay of Bengal. It belongs to Puducherry union territory.)

=== Places of interest ===
Sites of pilgrimage include:

- Basar (originally, Vyasara) – Sri Gyana Saraswati temple is situated on the banks of Godavari in Adilabad district, Telangana. It is about 210 km (130 miles) from state capital Hyderabad and accessible by road and rail (nearest major station: Nizamabad, although Basar station also exists). It is considered that the sage Vyasa wrote the Mahabharata on the banks of Godavari at this location and thus the place came to be known as Vyasara.
- Kandhakurthi – Thriveni sangamam where three rivers join. Godavari, Manjira River and Haridra River
- Bhadrachalam – Hindu Temple of Rama constructed by Bhakta Ramdas in the 16th century
- Dharmapuri, Telangana – Hindu Temple of Narasimha. Godavari flows from north to south in Dharmapuri, hence the river is locally called 'Dakshina Vahini' [South Flowing]
- Kaleshwaram – Sri Kaleswara Mukhteswara swamy Temple is situated here on the banks of Triveni sangamam of rivers Godavari and Pranahita. It is 125 kilometres away from Karimnagar city, 115 km away from Warangal city.
- Trimbakeshwar – One of the twelve Jyotirlingas and ancient temple of Shiva
- Nanded – Takht Sri Hazur Sahib, second of the five most sacred places in Sikhism
- Nashik – One of the four Sinhastha Kumbh Mela, a Hindu pilgrimage place
- Paithan – Saint Eknath's native place, famous Jayakwadi Dam, and a beautiful garden named after Sant Dhnyaneshwar.

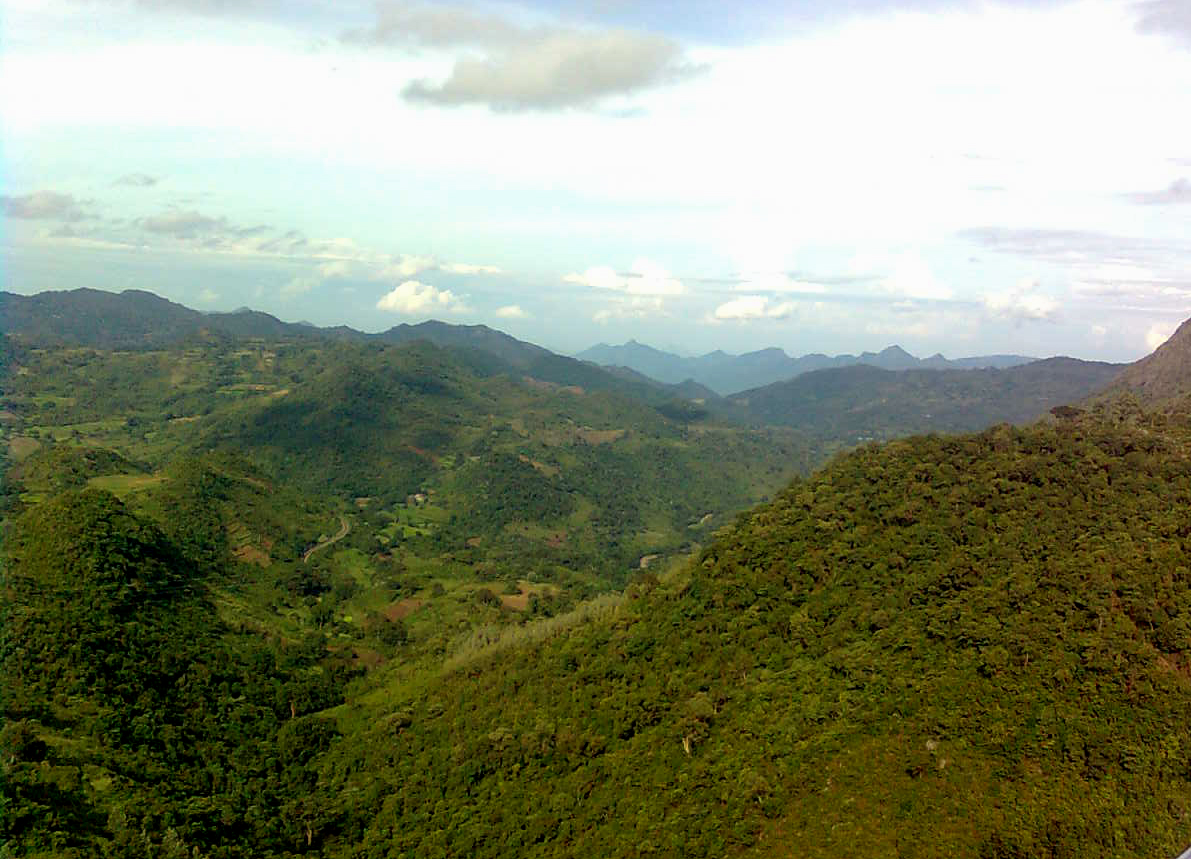
Scenic View of Araku Valley in Andhra Pradesh

- Antarvedi, Konaseema district – Antarvedi is famous for the Laxmi Narasimha Swamy temple constructed between the 15th and 16th centuries. There is also a temple of Shiva that is older than Narasimha Swamy temple. The temple's idol of Shiva was installed by Rama.
- Konaseema – Delta of Godavari
- Pattiseema – A village where a Hindu temple is located on a small hill on an island in the river
- Kovvur – A village where cows resided and a place where the maaya-dhenu fell dead. Footprints of the maaya-dhenu were seen even today in the famous place Kovvur called "Goshpadakshetram" also called "Gopadala Revu" where the footprints of the holy cow are seen near the temple of Shiva. Also a village which is the reason for the birth of river Godavari. It is famous for a Sanskrit school which has been built 63 years ago.
- Rajamahendravaram – A city known for its role in Telugu culture and birthplace of writers such as Nannayya, one of the Kavitrayam trinity of poets who translated the Mahabharata into Telugu. It is known for floriculture, tourism, industries and its heritage The Godavari Pushkaralu is a major local festival that is staged every 12 years.
- Deomali peak located in the Godavari basin is the highest peak (1672 m msl) in Odisha state.

== Flora and fauna ==
- The Krishna Godavari Basin is one of the main nesting sites of the endangered olive ridley sea turtle. Godavari is also a home to the endangered fringed-lipped carp (Labeo fimbriatus).
- The Coringa mangrove forests in the Godavari delta are the third largest mangrove formation in the country. Part of this has been declared as the Coringa Wildlife Sanctuary, renowned for reptiles. They also provide an important habitat to a wide variety of fish and crustaceans. These forests also act as barriers against cyclones, tropical storms, and storm surges, thus protecting the nearby villages.
- The Jayakwadi Bird Sanctuary is another haven for birds located near the town of Paithan spread across the back waters of the NathSagar Reservoir formed by impounding the Godavari by the massive Jayakwadi Dam. Its 341 km^{2} area is dotted by islands within the reservoir which serve as nesting sites for the birds.
- The Nandurmadmeshwar Bird Sanctuary is located along the back waters of the Godavari River near Nashik at its confluence with Kadva River. It is known as the Bharatpur of Maharashtra for the wide diversity of bird life that it harbours.

The following are few other wildlife sanctuaries located in the river basin:

- Bor Wildlife Sanctuary
- Eturnagaram Wildlife Sanctuary
- Gautala Wildlife Sanctuary
- Indravati National Park
- Kanger Ghati National Park
- Kawal Wildlife Sanctuary
- Kinnerasani Wildlife Sanctuary
- Kolleru Wildlife Sanctuary
- Manjira Wildlife Sanctuary
- Nagzira Wildlife Sanctuary
- Navegaon National Park
- Painganga Wildlife Sanctuary
- Papikonda Wildlife Sanctuary
- Pench National Park
- Pocharam Forest & Wildlife Sanctuary
- Pranahita Wildlife Sanctuary
- Tadoba Andhari Tiger Project
- Tipeshwar Wildlife Sanctuary

== Waterfalls ==
Duduma Waterfalls is 175 metres (574 ft) high and one of the highest waterfalls in southern India. It is located on the Sileru River which forms boundary between Andhra Pradesh and Odisha states. The following are a few other waterfalls located in the river basin:

- Bogatha
- Chitrakoot
- Kuntala
- Pochera
- Sahastrakunda
- Teerathgarh
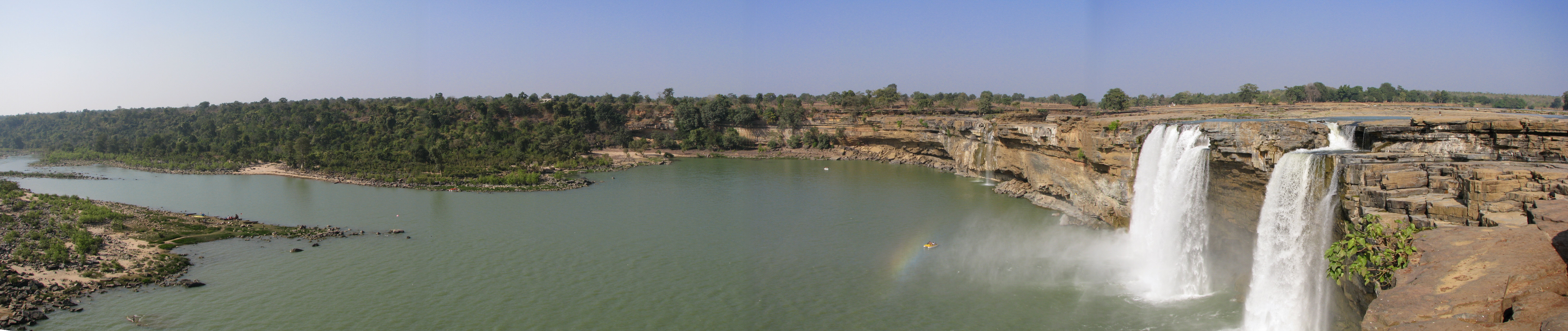
Panoramic view of downstream pond below the Chitrakoote Falls

== Crossings ==
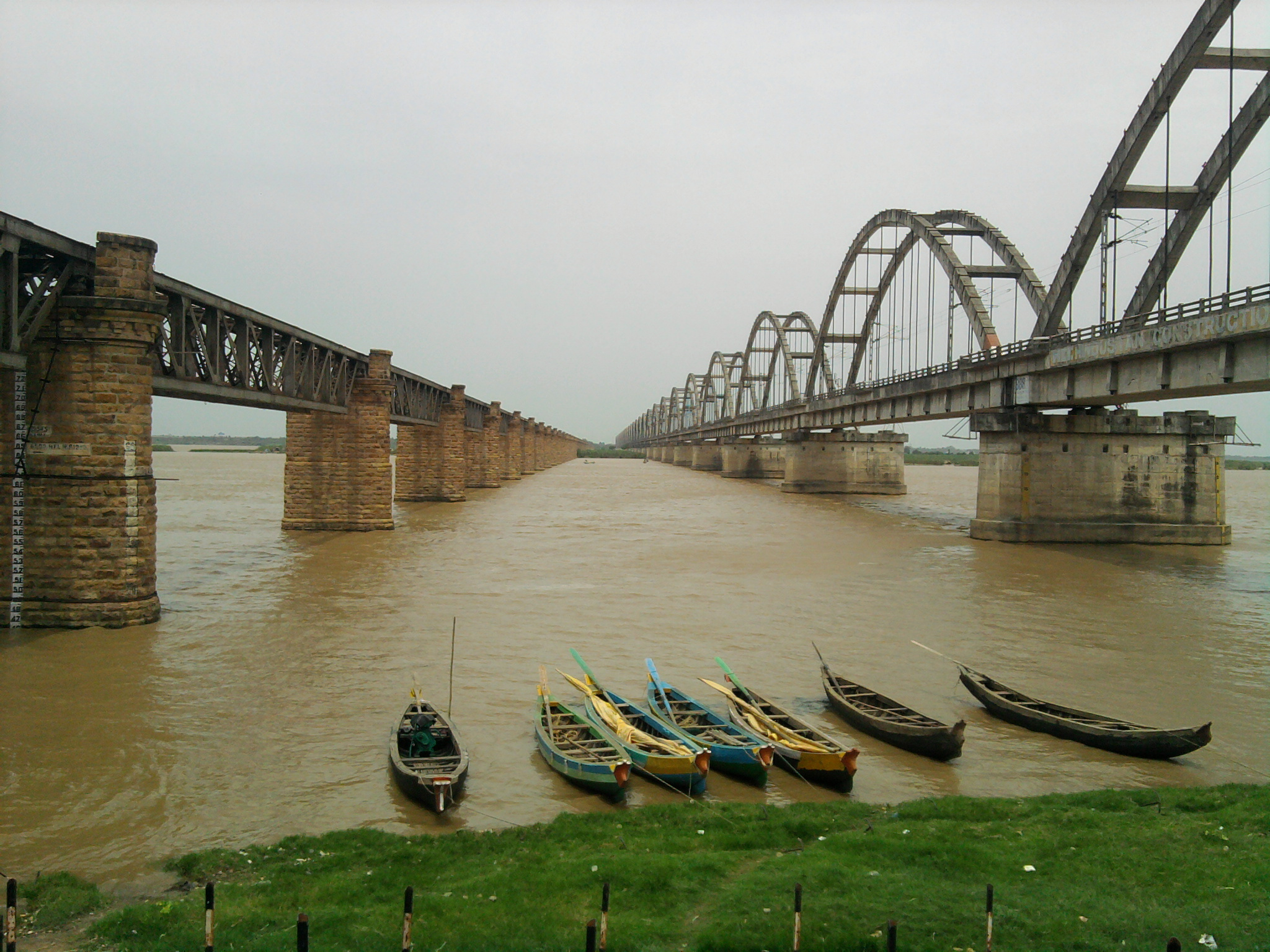
Havelock Bridge on the left and Godavari Arch Bridge on the right

There are 4 bridges spanning the river between East Godavari and West Godavari districts.

1. Old Godavari Bridge (also known as Havelock bridge, and named after then Madras governor)
2. Godavari Bridge (also known as Rail-cum-road bridge and Kovvur-Rajahmundry Bridge)
3. Godavari Arch Bridge (also known as New railway bridge)
4. Godavari Fourth Bridge (also known as new road bridge)

Details:

- Old Godavari Bridge. Construction of this bridge started in 1876, and was completed in 1897. It was constructed under the supervision of F.T. Granville Walton who had constructed the Dufferin Bridge over the Ganges, and Granville Mills, both British engineers. Spanning over 3 km in length, it linked the East Godavari and West Godavari districts. The bridge has been a vital link enabling trains to run between Chennai and Howrah. Trains continued over the bridge for a century until 1997, when train services over the bridge were suspended after the construction of two additional bridges.
- Godavari Bridge. Construction of this bridge started in 1970, and was completed in 1974. It serves as both a railway and a roadway between the East Godavari and West Godavari Districts.
- Godavari Arch Bridge. This bridge was completed in 1997, was built upstream of the earlier bridges.
- Godavari Fourth Bridge. This bridge is the newest. It was opened to public from Godavari Pushkaras 2015. This is a road connectivity bridge link supposed to ease traffic flow between Rajamahendravaram and Kovvur

== Dams ==
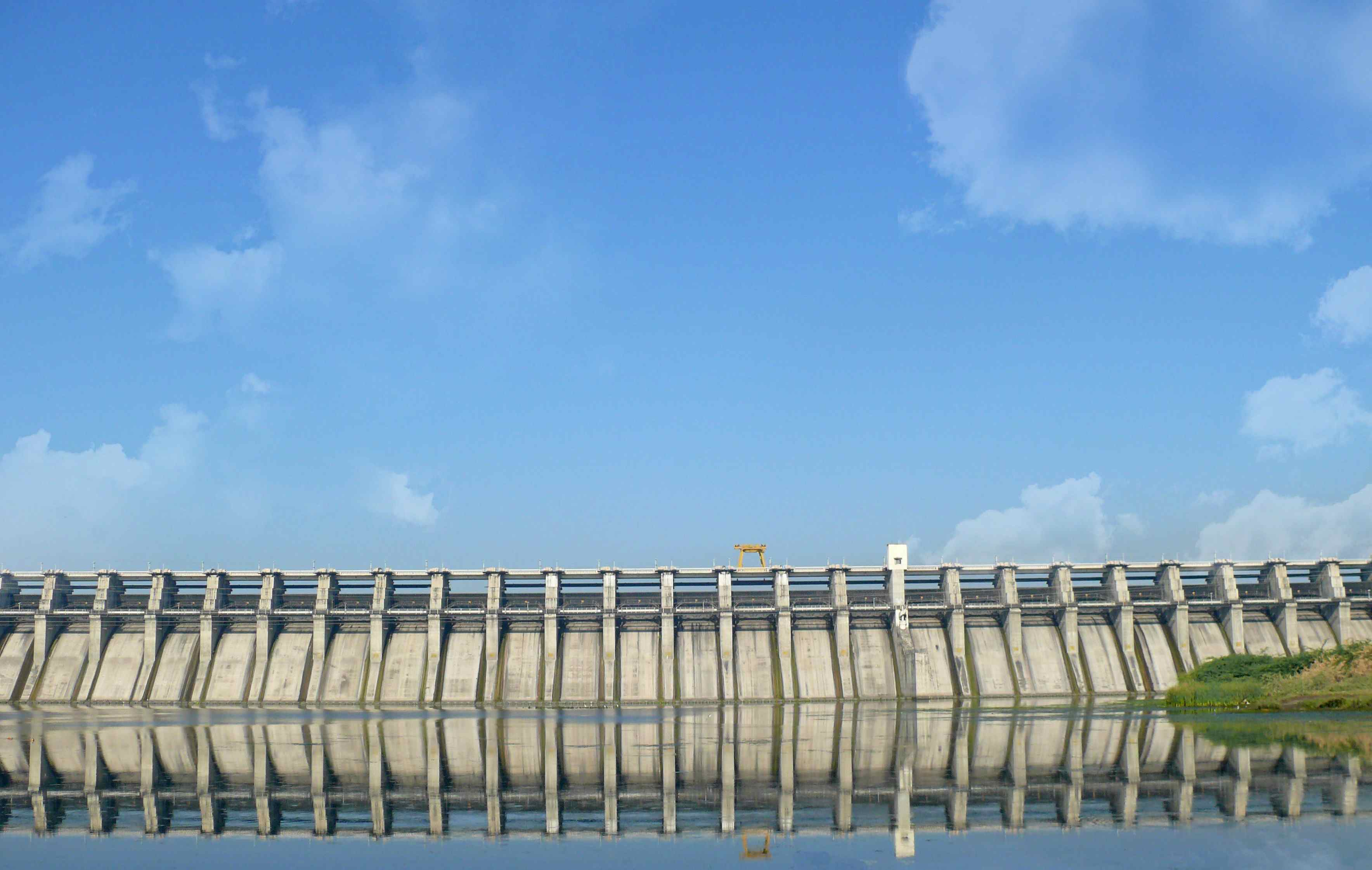
An upstream view of Jayakwadi Dam.

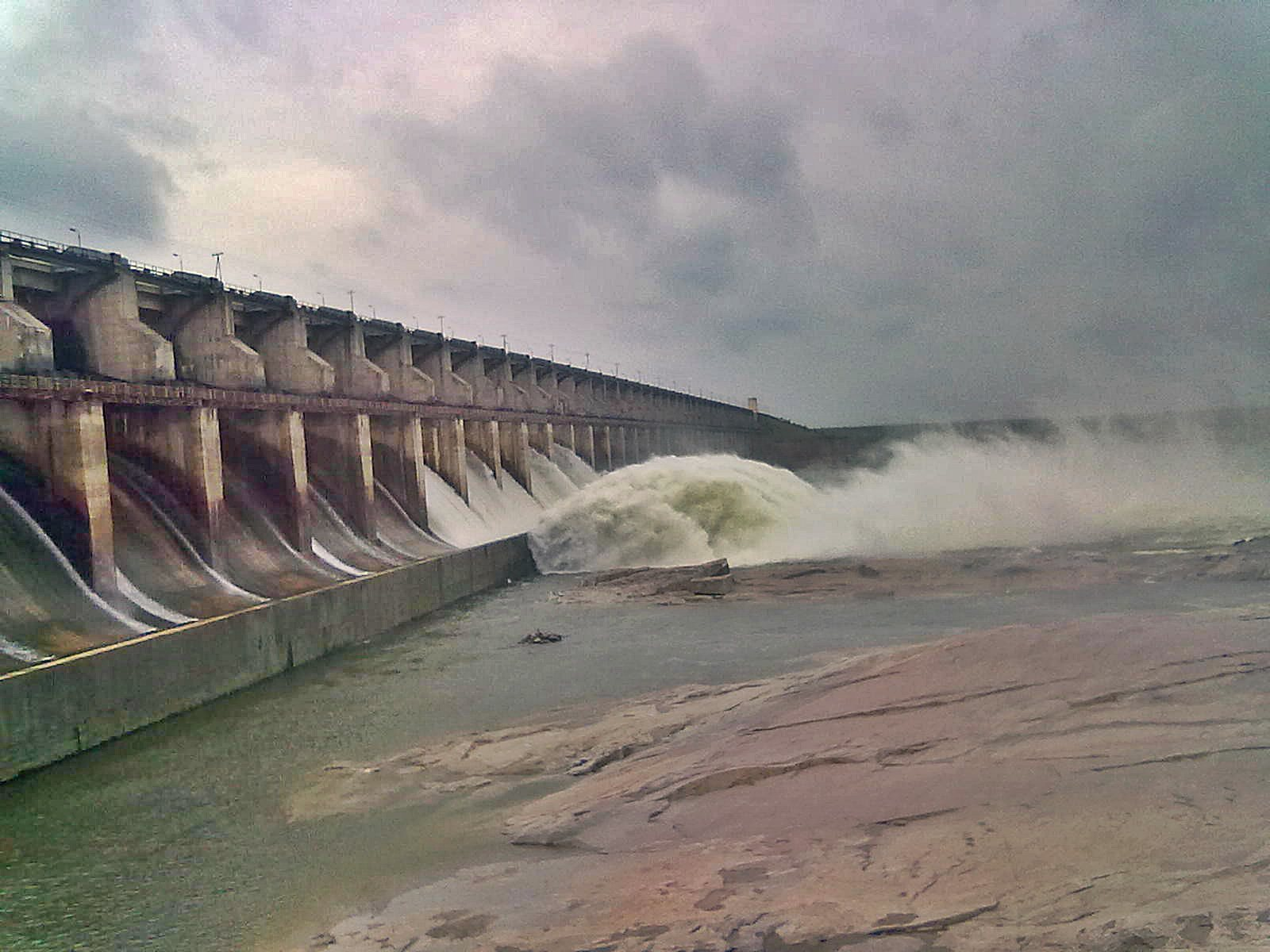
Sriram Sagar Dam.

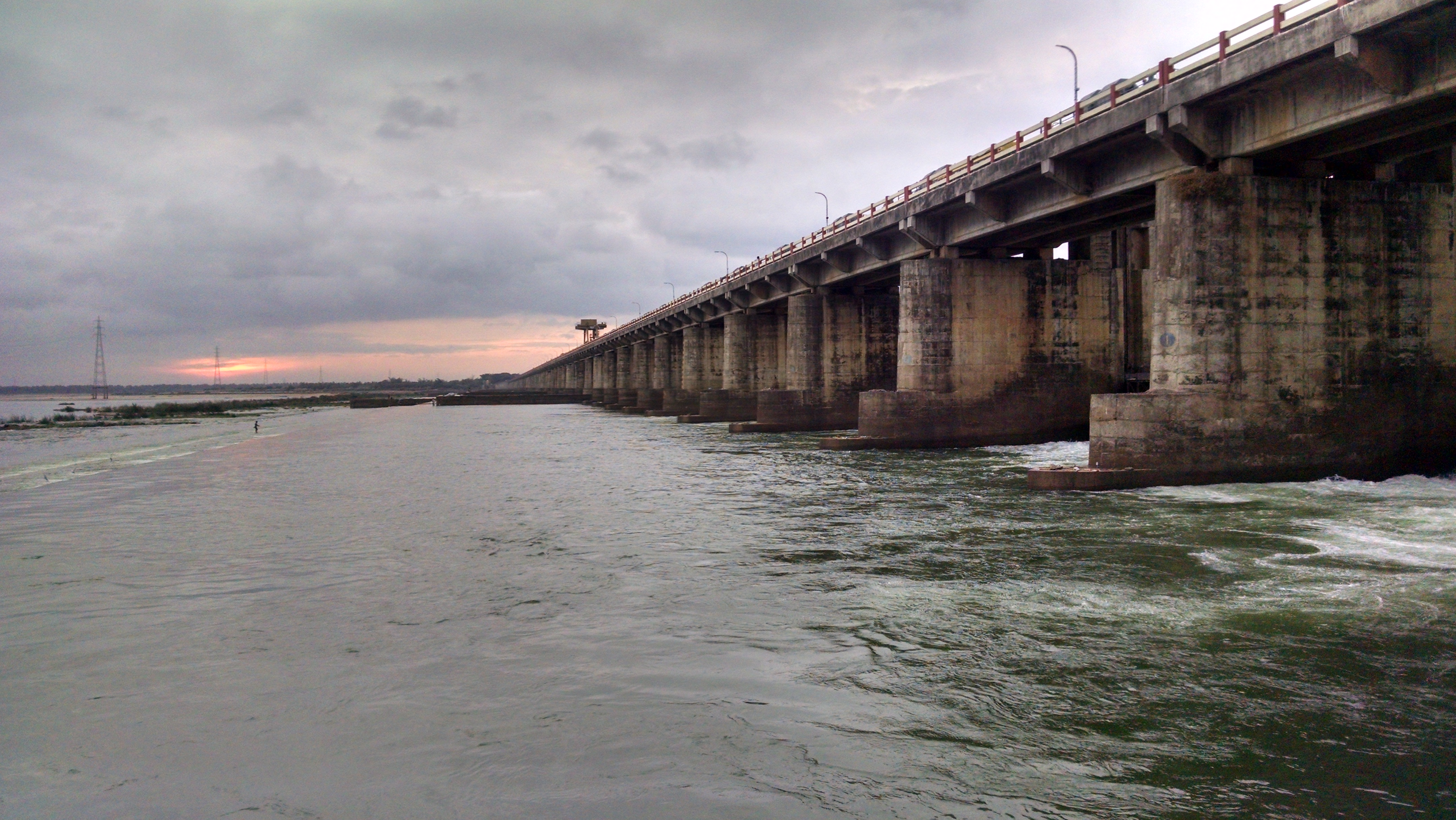
Sir Arthur Cotton Barrage at Rajamahendravaram City.

The main Godavari River up to the confluence with Pranhita tributary is dammed fully to utilize the available water for irrigation. However, its main tributaries Pranhita, Indravati and Sabari which join in the lower reaches of the basin, carry three times more water compared to main Godavari. In 2015, the water surplus Godavari River is linked to the water deficit Krishna River by commissioning the Polavaram right bank canal with the help of Pattiseema lift scheme to augment water availability to the Prakasam Barrage located in Andhra Pradesh. More dams are constructed in the Godavari River basin than in any other river basin of India. The following are the few dams located in the river basin:

- Gangapur Dam: This is a large earth fill dam with gross water storage of 215.88 million cubic metres, and located 10 km (6.2 mi) upstream from Nashik city. The reservoir known as the Gangapur Bandh Sagar provides drinking water to the Nashik city and also supplies water to the thermal power station situated downstream at Eklahare.
- Jayakwadi Dam: Located near Paithan, it is one of the largest earthen dams in India. This dam was built to address the dual problems of flooding along the banks, during monsoon months, and that of drought, rest of the year, in the Marathwada region. Two 'left' and 'right' canals provide the irrigation to fertile land up to Nanded district. This dam has contributed to industrial development of Aurangabad and Jalna, Maharashtra. Majalgaon Dam is also constructed under Jayakwadi stage 2 to expand the irrigation potential further in Parbhani, Nanded and Beed districts.
- Vishnupuri barrage: Asia's Largest Lift Irrigation project, the Vishnupuri Prakalp has been constructed on the river at a distance of 5 km (3.1 mi) from the city Nanded.
- Ghatghar Dam was built for hydro power generation by diverting the water of Pravara tributary outside Godavari river basin to a west flowing river which joins Arabian sea.
- Upper Vaitarna reservoir was built across west flowing Vaitarna river merging some part of Godavari river catchment area. Godavari water impounded in this reservoir is diverted outside the river basin for Mumbai city drinking water supply after generating hydro power.
- Sriram Sagar Dam: This is another multipurpose project on the Godavari River on the borders of Adilabad and Nizamabad District. It is near the town of Pochampadu, 60 km away from Nizamabad. It has been described by The Hindu as a "lifeline for a large part of Telangana". It serves the irrigation needs in Karimnagar, Warangal, Adilabad, Nalgonda, and Khammam districts and also generates power.
- Sir Arthur Cotton Barrage was built by Sir Arthur Cotton in 1852. It got damaged in 1987 floods, and rebuilt as a barrage cum roadway soon after and named after him. The roadway connects Rajamahendravaram in East Godavari and Vijjeswaram in West Godavari. The irrigation canals of this barrage also form part of National Waterway 4.

== Navigation ==
Under National Waterway 4 project, Godavari and Krishna rivers are being developed suitable for navigation. Initially, waterways using irrigation canals and the main river courses for interconnecting Kakinada, Puducherry, Bhadrachalam on Godavari and Ibrahimpatnam on Krishna would be developed suitable for 500 tons cargo carrying ships. Later, Godavari main river course would be developed as waterway up to Nashik city.

== Hydro power stations ==
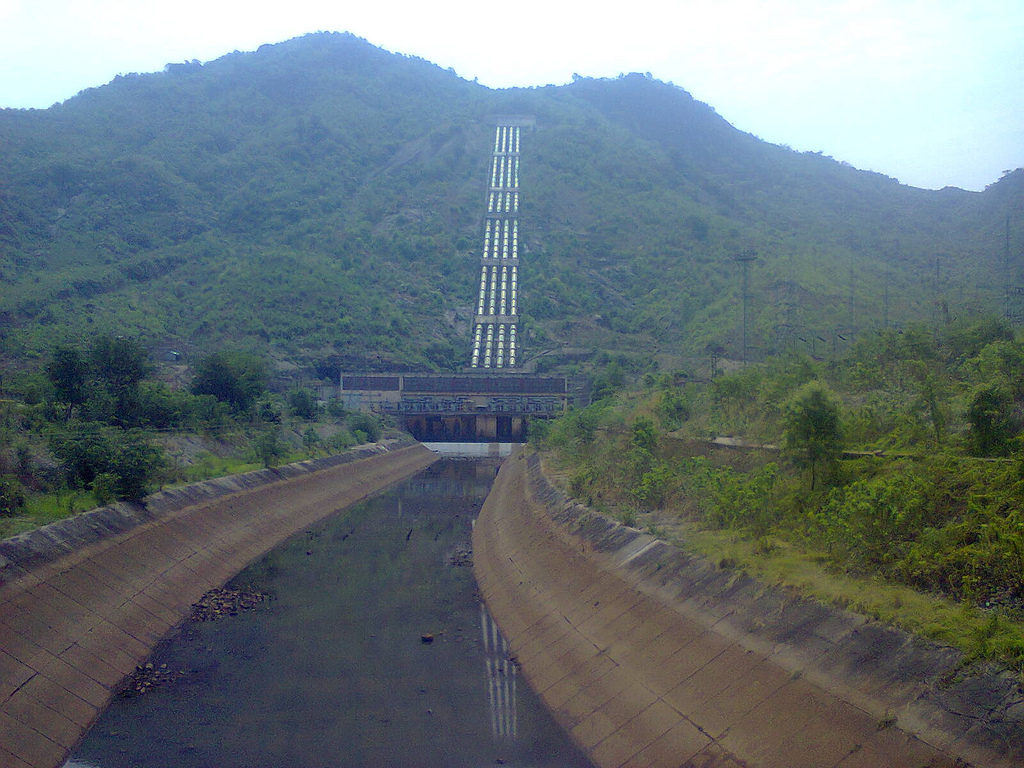
Upper Indiravati power house

The Godavari River in Maharashtra is one of the rivers whose water energy is least harnessed for generating hydro electricity. The 600 MW capacity Upper Indravati hydro power station is the biggest hydro power station which diverts Godavari River water to the Mahanadi River basin. The following is the list of hydro electric power stations excluding small and medium installations.

Hydroelectric power stations on Godavari River
Name of the project	Rated Power (in MW)
Upper Indravati	600
Machkund	120
Balimela	510
Upper Sileru	240
Lower Sileru	460
Upper Kolab	320
Pench	160
Ghatghar pumped storage	250
Polavaram ^{(under construction)}	960

== Unutilized water ==
The average annual water availability (precipitation minus natural evapotranspiration) is 129.17 billion cubic meters (4560 tmcft). Nearly 2490 tmcft of water has gone waste to the sea on average in a water year from 1 June 2003 to 31 May 2022 (19 years). The yearly water unutilized is given below

Unutilized water
Water year	03-04	04-05	05-06	06-07	07-08	08-09	09-10	10–11	11-12	12–13	13–14	14–15	15-16	16-17	17-18	18–19	19–20	20–21	21–22	22-23
Water availability (tmcft)	5034	6037	5538	5354	4219	3633	2065	7512	3288	5333	8661	4244	3305	5787	3184	4067	6435	5725	4917	8006
Unutilized water (tmcft)	3190	1628	301	4875	2862	1819	743	4015	1538	2969	5827	2006	1611	2896	1026	2435	1757	3436	2377	na

There is least possibility to construct new reservoirs in the river basin area due to land submergence and displacement of population. However, a freshwater coastal reservoir, located on the adjacent sea, with adequate storage capacity (nearly 29 billion m^{3}) is economically feasible to harness the remaining unutilized water in the river.

== Geology and sediment transfer in the Godavari Drainage Basin ==
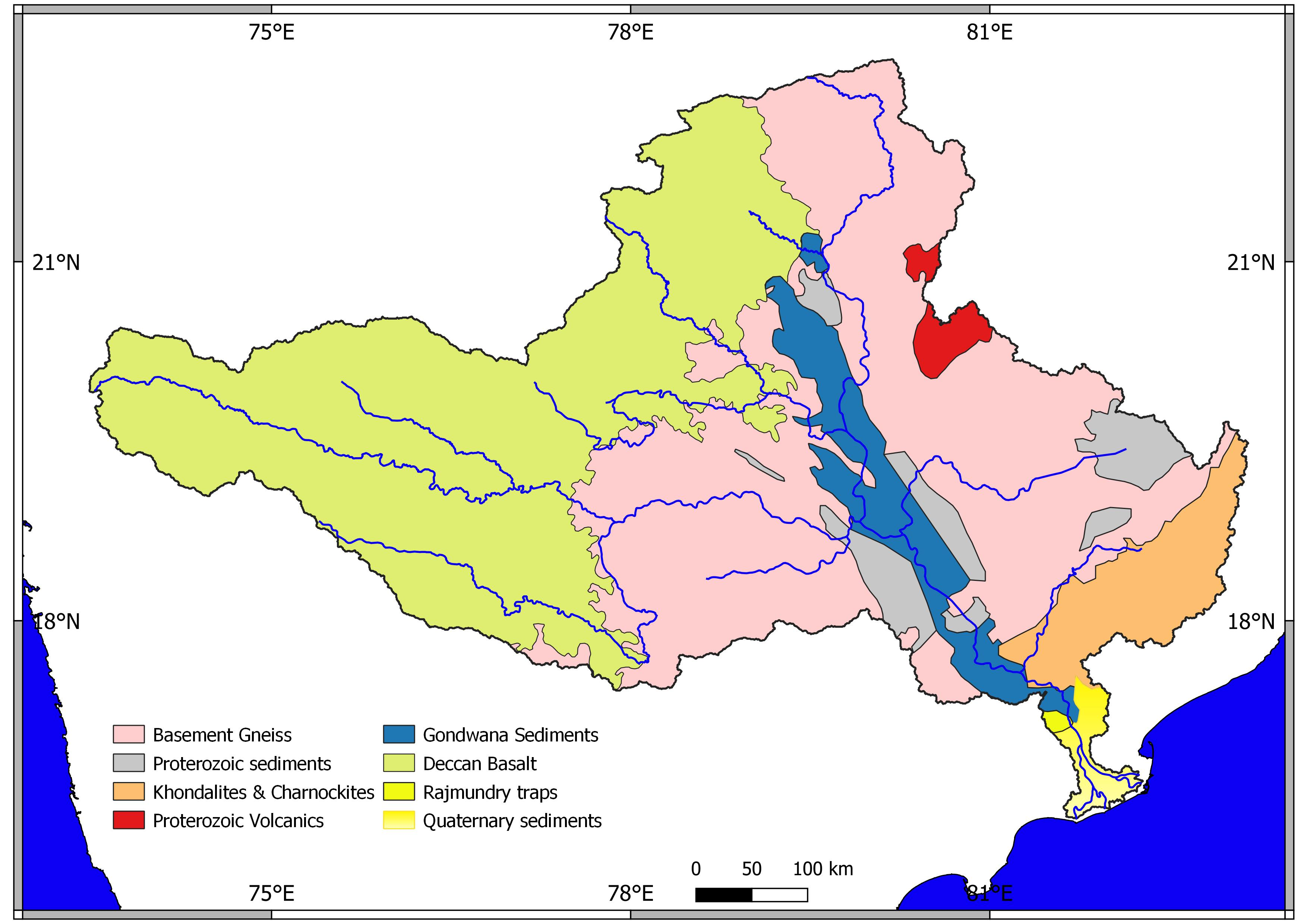
Generalized Geological Map of Godavari Drainage Basin

The primary and initial catchment of the Godavari drainage basin is largely represented by the basalt of the Deccan Volcanic Province (~50% of the total basin area). This is followed by the Precambrian granites and gneisses of the eastern Dharwar Craton, sandstones, shales and limestones of the Gondwana Supergroup, various sedimentary units of Cuddapah and Vindhyan basins, charnockites and khondalites of the Proterozoic Eastern Ghats Mobile Belt and the sandstones of the Rajahmundry Formation. The Godavari River carries the largest sediment load among the peninsular rivers and the majority of the mass transfer in Godavari occurs during the monsoon. Mineral magnetic studies of the Godavari River sediments suggest that the floodplains in the entire stretch of the river are characterized by a Deccan basalt source. The bed loads on the other hand are of sourced from local bedrock. Influx of Deccan source in the Godavari River up to the delta regions and possibly in the Bay of Bengal off the Godavari, therefore, can be related to the intensive chemical weathering in the Deccan basalts. Abrupt increase in δ^{13}C values and decrease in TOC content accompanied with a significant increase in ferrimagnetic mineral concentration in Bay of Bengal sediments from ~3.2 to 3.1 cal. ka BP reflected a shift of organic carbon and sediment source and a severe decline in vegetation coverage. Such phenomena indicate intensified deforestation and soil/rock erosion in the Deccan Plateau producing higher ferrimagnetic mineral inputs, which is in agreement with significant expansion of agricultural activities in the Deccan Chalcolithic cultural period.

== Mineral deposits ==
The Godavari River basin is endowed with rich mineral deposits such as oil and gas, coal, iron, limestone, manganese, copper, bauxite, granite, laterite, and others. The following are the few noted deposits:

- Araku hills, bauxite
- Godavari Valley Coalfield, coal
- Bailadila iron, iron
- Krishna Godavari Basin, oil & gas
- Malanjkhand, copper
- MOIL, manganese
- Pench Kanhan Coalfield, coal
- Rowghat Mines, iron
- Wardha Valley Coalfield, coal
- River plunge pools across Papikondalu, gold

== Ecological concerns ==
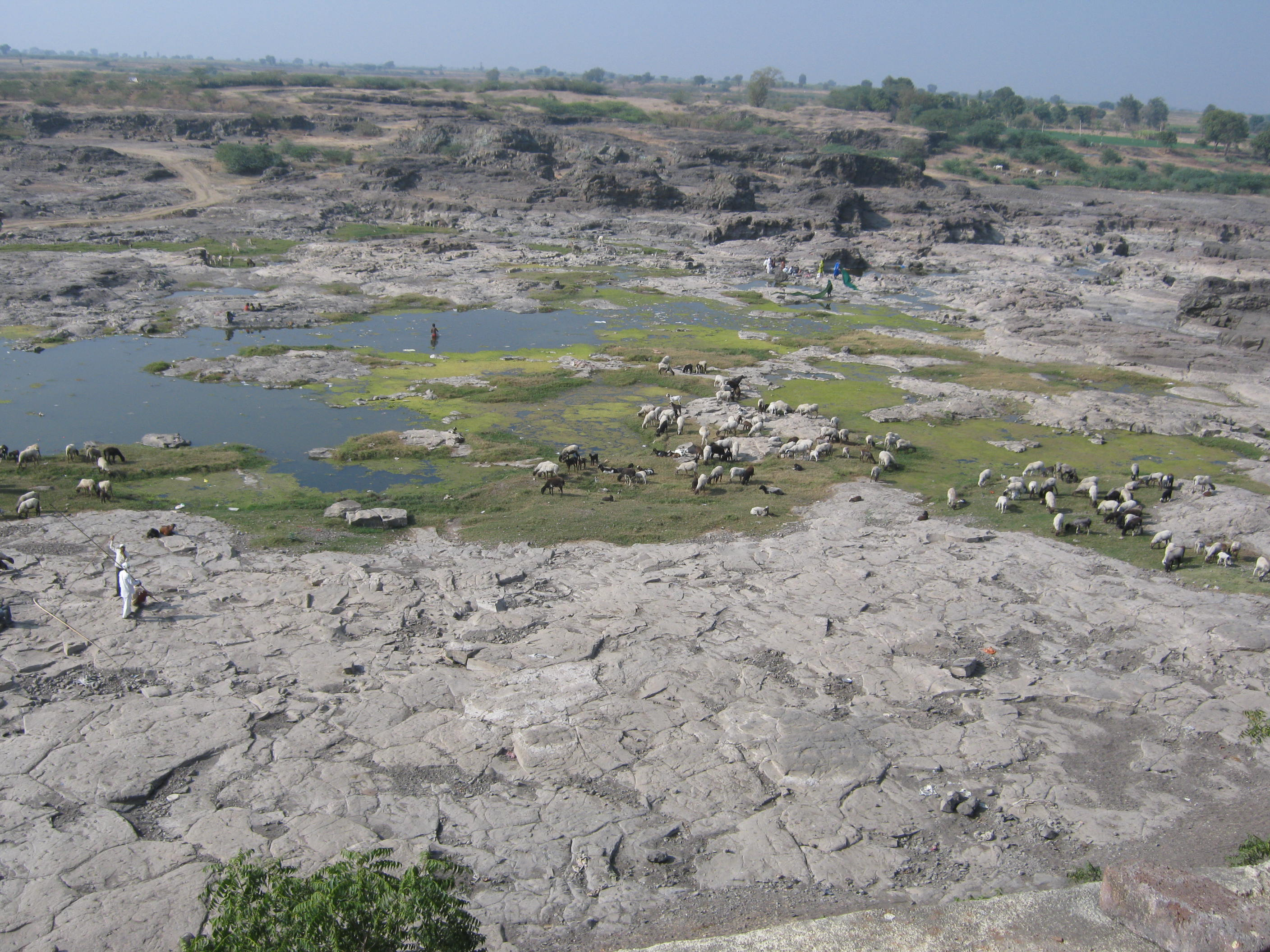
Dried up Godavari exposing flood basalt river bed as seen from the back of Changdev temple in Puntamba

The frequent drying up of the Godavari River in the drier months has been a matter of great concern. Indiscriminate damming along the river has been cited as an obvious reason. Within Maharashtra, sugarcane irrigation has been blamed as one of the foremost causes.

In 2013, the river was at its all-time low in the Nizamabad district of Telangana. This had hit the growth of fish, making the life of fishermen miserable. The water-level was so low that people could easily walk into the middle of the river. Shortage in rainfall and closure of the controversial Babli project gates in Maharashtra was thought to have affected the water flow in the river and water availability to the Sriram Sagar Project except during above 20% excess monsoon (i.e. one out of four years) years.

A study has found that the delta is at a greater risk as the rate of sediment aggradation (raising the level of the delta through sediment deposition) no longer exceeds relative sea level rise. It further states that the suspended sediment load at the delta has reduced from 150·2 million tons during 1970–1979 to 57·2 million tons by 2000–2006, which translates into a three-fold decline in the past 4 decades. Impacts of this can be seen in destroyed villages like Uppada in Godavari delta, destruction of Mangrove forests and fragmentation of shoreline – possibly a fallout of dam construction.

Said to further epitomise the insensitivity towards Godavari, is the Polavaram Project which is touted to be gigantic – both in terms of size and violations. Deemed as being pointless and politically driven, the project raises questions about environmental clearance, displacement of upstream human habitations, loss of forest cover, technicalities in the dam design which are said to play down flood threats and unsafe embankments.

High alkalinity water is discharged from the ash dump areas of many coal fired power stations into the river which further increases the alkalinity of the river water whose water is naturally of high alkalinity since the river basin is draining vast area of basalt formations. This problem aggravates during the lean flow months in entire river basin. Already the Godavari basin area in Telangana is suffering from high alkalinity and salinity water problem which is converting soils in to unproductive sodic alkali soils. The following are the few coal fired power stations located in the river basin:

Thermal power stations in Godavari River basin
Name of Power Station	Rated Power (in MW)
Koradi Thermal Power Station	2,600
Khaparkheda Thermal Power Station	1,340
Tiroda Thermal Power Station	3,300
Butibori Power Plant	600
RattanIndia Nashik TPS	1,350
Chandrapur STPS	3,340
Mauda Super Thermal Power Station	1,000
Parli Thermal Power Station	1,130
Dhariwal Power Station	300
Nashik Thermal Power Station	910
Wardha Warora Power Plant	540
Pench Thermal Power Plant	1,320
Lanco Vidarbha Thermal Power	1,320
NTPC Ramagundam	2,600
Kothagudem Thermal Power Station	1,720
Kakatiya Thermal Power Station	1,100
Ramagundam B Thermal Power Station	60
Manuguru Heavy water plant's power station	90
Singareni thermal power station	1,800
Bhadradri Thermal Power Plant	1,080

== In popular culture ==
One of the ships of the Indian Navy has been named INS Godavari after the river. Godavari is also the codename of some variants of AMD APU chips.

== See also ==
- Godavari Water Disputes Tribunal
- Detailed list of Tributaries
- Godavari River Basin Irrigation Projects
- Godavari Arch Bridge
- Godavari Bridge
- Old Godavari Bridge
- Sacred waters
- List of dams and reservoirs in India
- River basins in Madhya Pradesh
- Godavari Maha Pushkaram
- Peninsular River System Of India
