= Banganga (disambiguation) =

Banganga Tank is an ancient water tank at Walkeshwar Temple Complex in Malabar Hill area of Mumbai City

Banganga may also refer to:

== Rivers in India ==
- Baanganga, legendary rivers or ponds in Ramayana, Mahabharata, and Puranas, etc
- Banganga River (Jammu and Kashmir), a river that flows through Katra, Jammu and Kashmir
- Banganga River (Rajasthan), a river in Rajasthan, known for the annual Banganga Fair
- Banganga River (Maharashtra), a river in Maharashtra, that flows through the Nashik district
- Banganga River, a small rivulet, at the foothills of shrine Vaishno Devi
- Banganga River, a river in Himachal Pradesh that flows near Kangra

== Other uses ==
- Banganga, Nepal, a municipality in Kapilvastu District, Nepal
