= Pench =

Pench may refer to:

- Pench National Park, Madhya Pradesh, India
- Pench Tiger Reserve, Madhya Pradesh, India
- Pench River, India
- Pench Kanhan Coalfield, Madhya Pradesh, India
