= Malaj Khand =

- Town
- Location in Madhya Pradesh, India Malaj Khand (India)
- Coordinates: 22°1′41″N 80°42′48″E
- Country: India
- State: Madhya Pradesh
- District: Balaghat

Population (2001)
  - Total: 32,326

Languages
  - Official: Hindi
- Time zone: UTC+5:30 (IST)
- PIN: 481116
- ISO 3166 code: IN-MP
- Vehicle registration: MP

Malaj Khand is a town and a municipality in Balaghat district in the Indian state of Madhya Pradesh. This town has the biggest open copper mines in Asia and most of its population are the employed by the copper mines owned by the Central Government(Ministry of mines).

== Climate ==
Climate data for Malanjkhand (1991–2020)
Month	Jan	Feb	Mar	Apr	May	Jun	Jul	Aug	Sep	Oct	Nov	Dec	Year
Record high °C (°F)	31.7 (89.1)	35.2 (95.4)	40.0 (104.0)	43.1 (109.6)	44.5 (112.1)	45.6 (114.1)	39.5 (103.1)	34.2 (93.6)	35.0 (95.0)	34.8 (94.6)	32.2 (90.0)	31.3 (88.3)	45.6 (114.1)
Mean daily maximum °C (°F)	24.8 (76.6)	28.0 (82.4)	33.4 (92.1)	37.6 (99.7)	40.2 (104.4)	35.2 (95.4)	29.8 (85.6)	28.5 (83.3)	29.8 (85.6)	30.0 (86.0)	27.6 (81.7)	25.3 (77.5)	30.8 (87.4)
Mean daily minimum °C (°F)	8.9 (48.0)	11.7 (53.1)	15.9 (60.6)	20.2 (68.4)	24.2 (75.6)	24.3 (75.7)	22.9 (73.2)	22.6 (72.7)	21.7 (71.1)	18.1 (64.6)	12.8 (55.0)	8.4 (47.1)	17.6 (63.7)
Record low °C (°F)	0.4 (32.7)	2.1 (35.8)	7.2 (45.0)	10.4 (50.7)	15.9 (60.6)	15.5 (59.9)	19.1 (66.4)	18.9 (66.0)	16.4 (61.5)	9.9 (49.8)	5.6 (42.1)	2.3 (36.1)	0.4 (32.7)
Average rainfall mm (inches)	25.2 (0.99)	21.7 (0.85)	24.4 (0.96)	14.9 (0.59)	14.5 (0.57)	179.0 (7.05)	403.6 (15.89)	350.5 (13.80)	174.6 (6.87)	56.2 (2.21)	18.8 (0.74)	8.9 (0.35)	1,292.3 (50.88)
Average rainy days	1.5	2.0	2.1	1.3	1.8	8.8	18.3	16.8	10.1	3.2	1.0	0.3	67.3
Average relative humidity (%) (at 17:30 IST)	52	42	31	25	28	58	82	85	79	68	61	53	56
Source: India Meteorological Department

== Demographics ==
As of 2001 India census, Malaj Khand had a population of 32,326. Males constitute 50% of the population and females 50%. Malaj Khand has an average literacy rate of 62%, higher than the national average of 59.5%: male literacy is 71%, and female literacy is 54%. In Malaj Khand, 14% of the population is under 6 years of age. Pincode of Malaj Khand is 481116.
