= Godavari Valley Coalfield =

Coalfield in Telangana State, India

- Location in Telangana
- Location: Telangana, India; 18°38′42″N 79°33′50″E
- Company: The Singareni Collieries Company Limited
- Website: scclmines.com
- Acquired: 1920

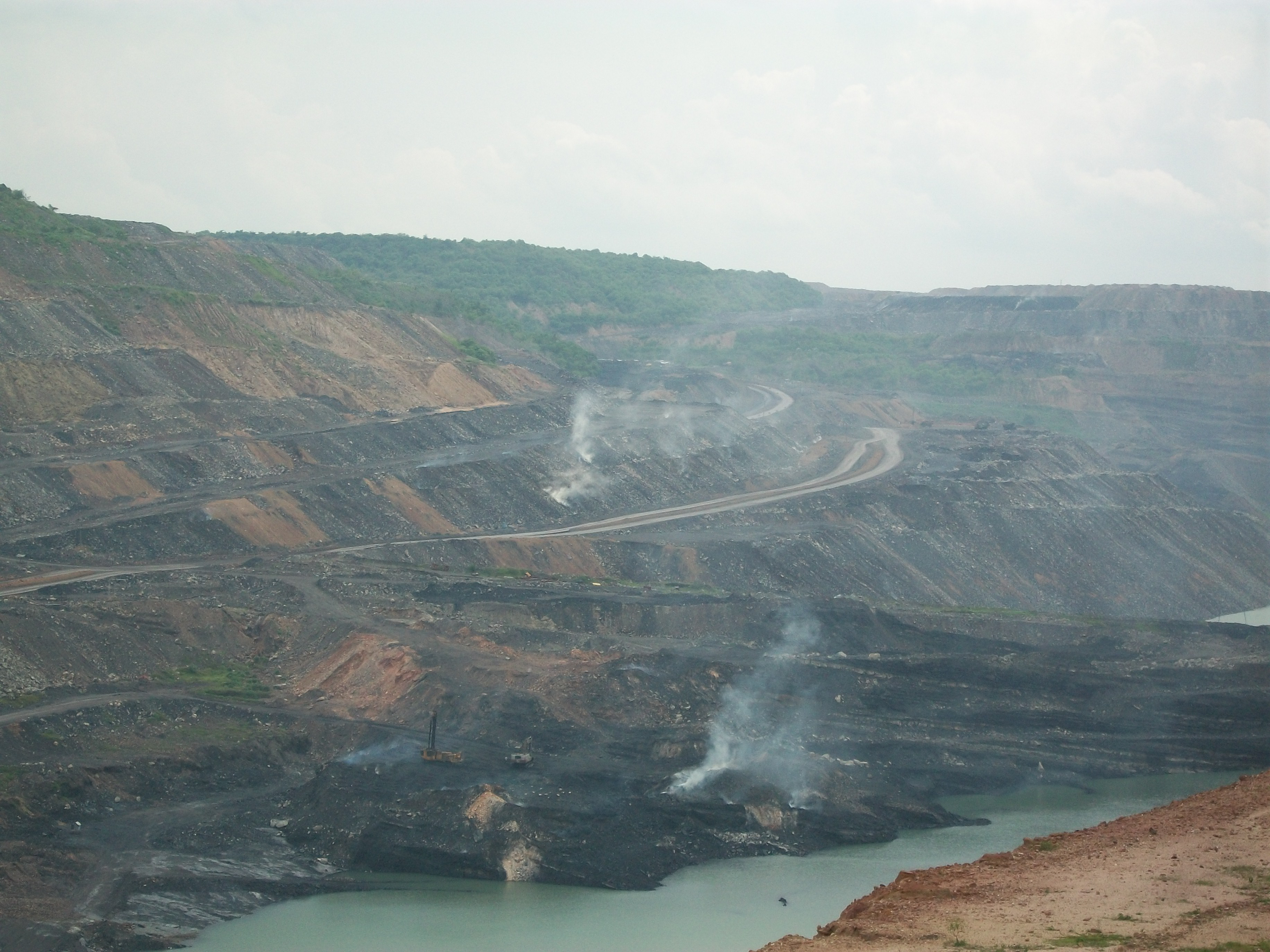
Singareni opencast coal mines at Manuguru on Godavari Valley Coalfields

Godavari Valley Coalfield is located in the districts of Adilabad, Karimnagar, Khammam and Warangal in the Indian state of Telangana. It is the only coalfield in South India. It lies in the basin of the Godavari River.

== History ==
Dr. King of the Geological Survey of India discovered coal in Khammam district in 1871. The Hyderabad (Deccan) Company Limited acquired mining rights to exploit the coal in 1886. The Singareni Collieries Company Limited, incorporated in 1920, acquired all assets of the Hyderabad (Deccan) Company Limited. Hyderabad State purchased majority shares of The Singareni Collieries Company Limited in 1945. With the reorganization of states, the controlling interest of The Singareni Collieries Company Limited vested with the Government of Andhra Pradesh in 1956 and now in Telanganaafter state bifurcation.

The implementation of the five year plans saw large scale expansion in the activities of The Singareni Collieries Company Limited. Since March 1960 it was jointly owned by the Government of Telangana and the Government of India. The activities of Godavari Valley Coalfield extended to the districts of Adilabad, Karimnagar, Khammam and Warangal. The coal extracted in the Godavari Valley Coalfield, the sole coalfield in South India, up to 2009-10 was about 929.12 million tonnes.

== The coalfield ==
The cumulative basin area of Godavari Valley Coalfield is 17,400 km^{2}. The coal bearing area is 11,000 km^{2}. However, the area considered potential for regional exploration is 1,700 km^{2}.

The Godavari Valley Coalfield, sometimes referred to Pranhita-Godavari Valley Coalfield, is a continuation of the Wardha Valley Coalfield. It extends over an area of 9,000 km^{2}. The Lower Gondwana rocks consisting of Talchir, Barakar and Kamthi measures are well developed in the area. The Godavari Valley Coalfield is divided into twelve coal belts. Important coalfields of the area are: Tandur Coalfield; North Godavari and South Godavari Coalfield; Karlapalli or Kamaram Coalfield; Ramagundam Coalfield etc.

== Reserves ==
According to the Geological Survey of India, Godavari Valley Coalfield has total reserves (as on 1 January 2004) of 16,697.26 million tonnes of non-coking coal, up to a depth of 1,200 m, out of which 8091.10 million tonnes are proved reserves and the rest being indicated or inferred. A large portion of the coal is up to a depth of 300 m.

Subsequent studies of Geological Survey of India attribute as much as 22,054.58 million tonnes of coal reserves to the Godavari Valley Coalfield.
