= Gangapur Dam =

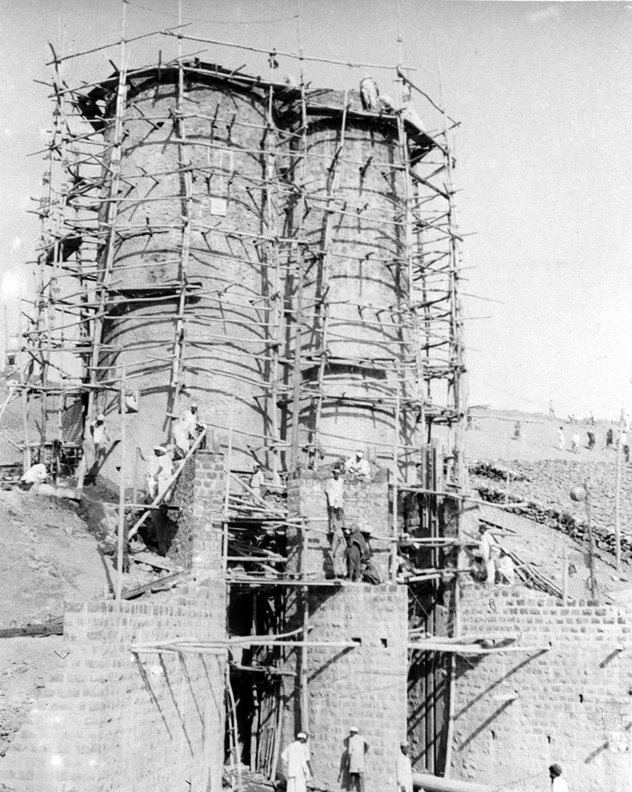
- The canal tower of Gangapur Dam in 1956

- Location within Maharashtra
- Official name: Gangapur Dam D01034
- Location: Nashik
- Coordinates: 20.0260565°N 73.6671498°E
- Opening date: 1965
- Owners: Government of Maharashtra, India

Dam and spillways
- Type of dam: Earthfill
- Impounds: Godavari River
- Height: 36.59 m (120.0 ft)
- Length: 3,902 m (12,802 ft)
- Dam volume: 4,612 km^{3} (1,106 cu mi)

Reservoir
- Total capacity: 0.203880 km^{3} (0.048913 cu mi)
- Surface area: 22,860 km^{2} (8,830 sq mi)

Gangapur Dam, is an earthfill dam on Godavari River near Nashik in the state of Maharashtra in India.

== Specifications ==
The height of the dam above lowest foundation is 36.59 m (120.0 ft) while the length is 3,902 m (12,802 ft). The volume content is 4,612 km^{3} (1,106 cu mi) and gross storage capacity is 215,880.00 km^{3} (51,792.37 cu mi).

Due to silt deposition in the reservoir area, the storage capacity of the dam has gradually reduced. The right side canal running towards Nashik is also closed due to the high civilization in the area. For these two reasons, an upstream dam, Kashypi Dam, is constructed which opened in 2000

== Purpose ==
- Irrigation

one of the earthen dam having emergency spillway

== See also ==
- Dams in Maharashtra
- List of reservoirs and dams in India
