= Kinnerasani River =

River in India

The Kinnerasani is an important tributary of Godavari River flowing through the Warangal and Bhadradri districts of Telangana and Eluru district of Andhra Pradesh.

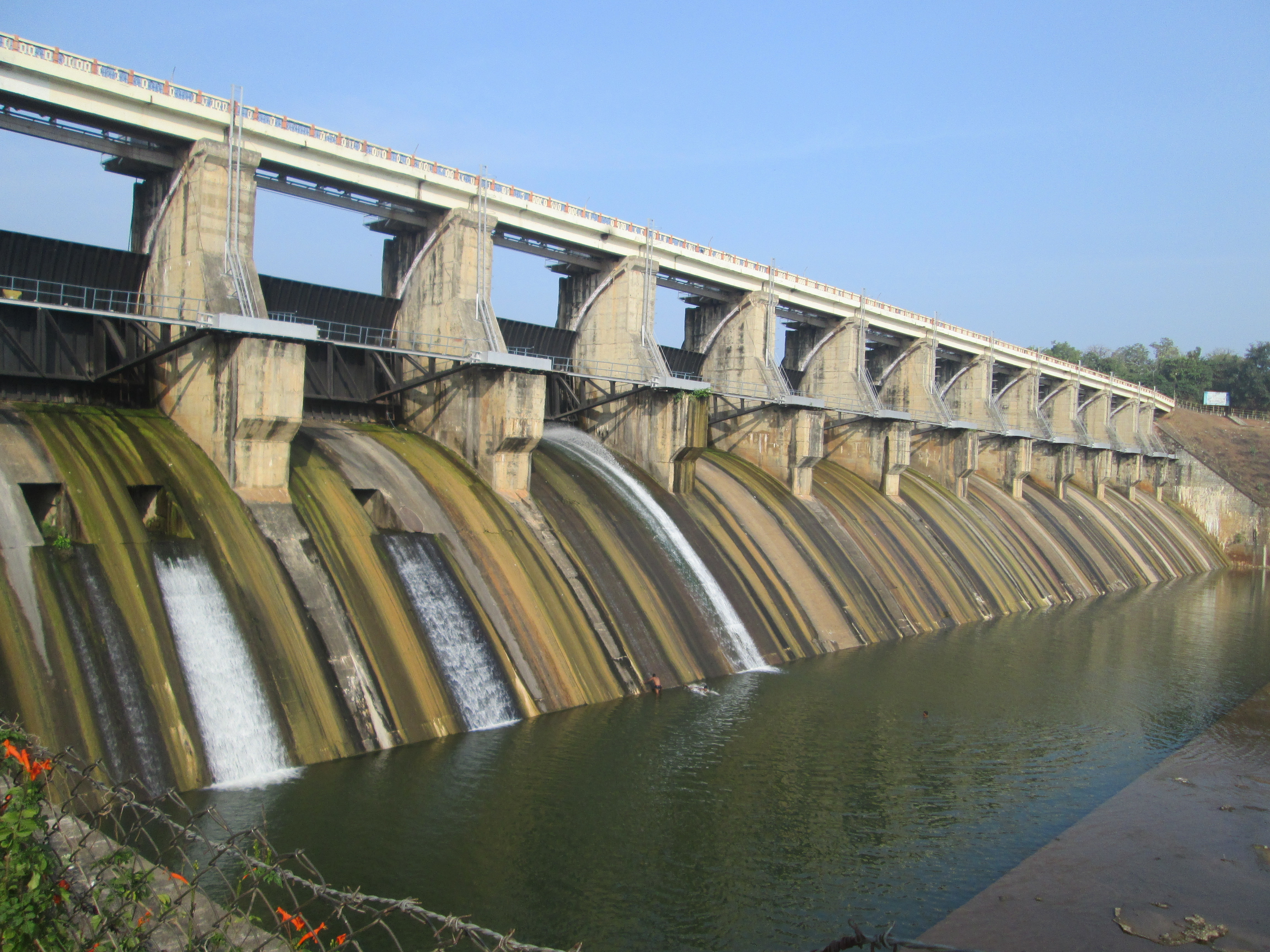
Kinnersani Dam built on the river near Paloncha

In the Khammam District, a dam known as the Kinnerasani Dam is built on this river. The backwaters of the dam are surrounded by verdant hills and come to be protected under the precincts of the Kinnerasani Wildlife Sanctuary. The gross storage capacity of the dam is 237.8 million cubic meters (Mcm) or 8.4 tmc ft The river drains on the right bank of Godavari in Telangana and forms common boundary between Andhra Pradesh and Telangana states before its confluence with main Godavari river.
