= Papikonda National Park =

National park in Andhra Pradesh, India

- IUCN category II (national park)
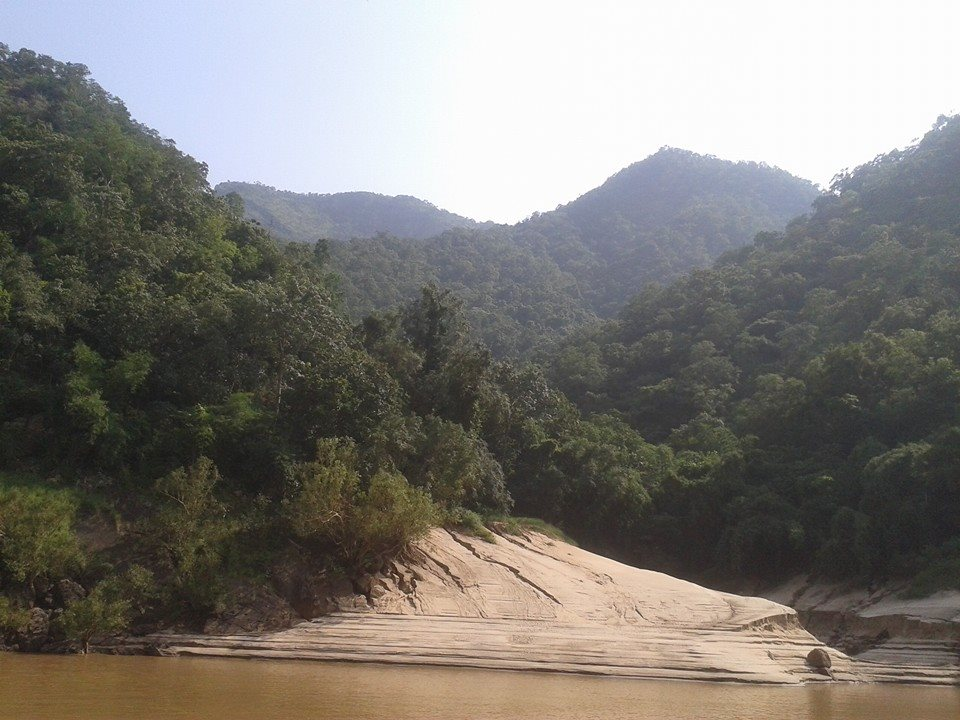
- Interactive map of Papikonda National Park
- Location: Andhra Pradesh, India
- Area: 1,012.86 km^{2} (391.07 sq mi)
- Established: 1978

Papikonda National Park is a national park in India, located near Rajamahendravaram in the Papi Hills of the Polavaram and Eluru districts of Andhra Pradesh, and covering an area of 1,012.86 km^{2} (391.07 mi^{2}). It is an Important Bird and Biodiversity Area and home to some endangered species of flora and fauna. No part of Papikonda remains outside East and West Godavari districts after 2014 and the construction of Polavaram Dam.

== History ==
Papikonda Wildlife Sanctuary was established in 1978. It was upgraded to a national park in 2008.

== Geography ==
The national park's boundaries lie between 18° 49’ 20" N to 19° 18’ 14" N, 79° 54’ 13" E to 83° 23’ 35" E spread across the Polavaram and Eluru districts of Andhra Pradesh. Its altitude ranges from 20 to 850 m (66 to 2,789 ft), and it receives an annual rainfall of 1168 mm. Godavari River flows through the park.

== Flora ==
The vegetation of Papikonda national park contains species of moist deciduous and dry deciduous forests. Tree species include Pterocarpus marsupium, Terminalia elliptica, Terminalia arjuna, Adina cordifolia, Sterculia urens, Mangifera indica, Anogeissus latifolia.

== Fauna ==
=== Mammals ===
The mammals either sighted or recorded by camera traps includes Bengal tiger, Indian leopard, Rusty-spotted cat, Jungle cat, Leopard cat, Sloth bear, Small Indian civet, Asian palm civet, Wild boar and Honey badger. Herbivores recorded include spotted deer, Sambar deer, Indian muntjac, Indian spotted chevrotain, Gaur, Nilgai and Four-horned antelope.

The national park has populations of both Rhesus macaque which are typically found north of Godavari and Bonnet macaque that are usually found south of Godavari. Gray langurs are also seen inside the national park. The presence of water buffaloes in the area was recorded during the British imperial time.

=== Birds ===
The national park was recognized as an Important Bird and Biodiversity Area by BirdLife International in 2016. Some of the endangered, vulnerable and near threatened species of birds reported includes Black-bellied tern, Pale-capped pigeon, Yellow-throated bulbul, Oriental darter, Pallid harrier, Great Thick-knee, River lapwing, River tern, Malabar pied hornbill, Alexandrine parakeet.

Some of the tropical moist forest species of birds sighted were Black-throated munia, Indian scimitar babbler, Jerdon's nightjar, Malabar trogon Malabar whistling thrush. A subspecies of Abbott's babbler identified and named after ornithologist K. S. R. Krishna Raju was sighted around the periphery of the national park.

=== Reptiles ===
Indian golden gecko, endemic to the Eastern Ghats was reported from this national park. King cobras were sighted in and around the protected area.

== Threats ==
Poaching, forest fires and clearing forest for cultivation are some of the threats.
