= Nasardi River =

Tributary of the river Godavari in Maharashtra, India

The Nandini (also known as the Nasardi) is an insignificant tributary of the river Godavari which runs its course through the city of Nashik, Maharashtra.

The river begins on the northern face the eastern spurs of Anjaneri hills to south-west of Nashik. The river quickly courses through the Nashik, draining much of its effluent waste. A survey in 2012 deemed the river the dirtiest river in Nashik District. The river drains into the Godavari at Samta Nagar.
