= Banganga River (Maharashtra) =

Coordinates: 20°03′04″N 74°02′50″E

Location
- Country: India
- State: Maharashtra
- District: Nashik

Physical characteristics
- Source: Ramsej Hill
  - location: India

Banganga is a small tributary of the Godavari River in the Nashik district, in the state of Maharashtra in western India.

The Banganga rises a little to the north-west of Ramsej hill and flows in a general easterly course, passing by Ozar, where a dam crosses it to divert the water into canals on both sides for irrigation. After passing Sukene it joins the Godavari. In 2012, the Ozar panchayat, citing safety issues, urged the authorities to construct a bridge over the Banganga River.

== See also ==
- List of rivers of India
- Rivers of India
- Baanganga
