= Wardha Warora Power Plant =

Coal-fired power station in India

Sai Wardha Power Plant is a coal-based thermal power plant located near Warora city in Chandrapur district in the Indian state of Maharashtra. The power plant is operated by Sai Wardha Power Generation Private Limited.

The coal for the plant is sourced from Western Coalfields Limited (WCL). The Engineering, procurement, and construction contract (EPCC) is given to Sichuan Electric Design Company of People's Republic of China.
