= Ramagundam B Thermal Power Station =

Power station in Telangana, India

- Country: India
- Location: Ramagundam, Peddapalli, Telangana, India
- Coordinates: 18°45′18″N 79°27′22″E
- Status: Operational
- Commission date: October 1971
- Operator: Telangana Power Generation Corporation Limited (TGGENCO)

Thermal power station
- Primary fuel: Coal

Power generation
- Units operational: 1X62.50 MW
- Nameplate capacity: 62.50 MW

Ramagundam B Super Thermal Power Plant is located at Ramagundam in Telangana. It is one of the coal based power plants of Telangana Power Generation Corporation Limited (TGGENCO).

== Power plant ==
Ramagundam B Thermal Power Station has an installed capacity of 62.5 MW (single unit). The unit was commissioned in October, 1971, with the financial assistance of USAID. The project cost Rs 14.8 crores.

With the installation of an electrostatic precipitator in 1987 under the R&M Scheme, the problems associated with ID fan etc. were overcome, and the station has been running satisfactorily.

The station has achieved the height plant load factor in all India level for four times in the group of 62.5 MW to 63.5 MW units.

== Installed capacity ==
| Stage | Unit number | Installed capacity (MW) | Date of commissioning | Status |
|---|---|---|---|---|
| First | 1 | 62.5 | October 1971 | Running |
