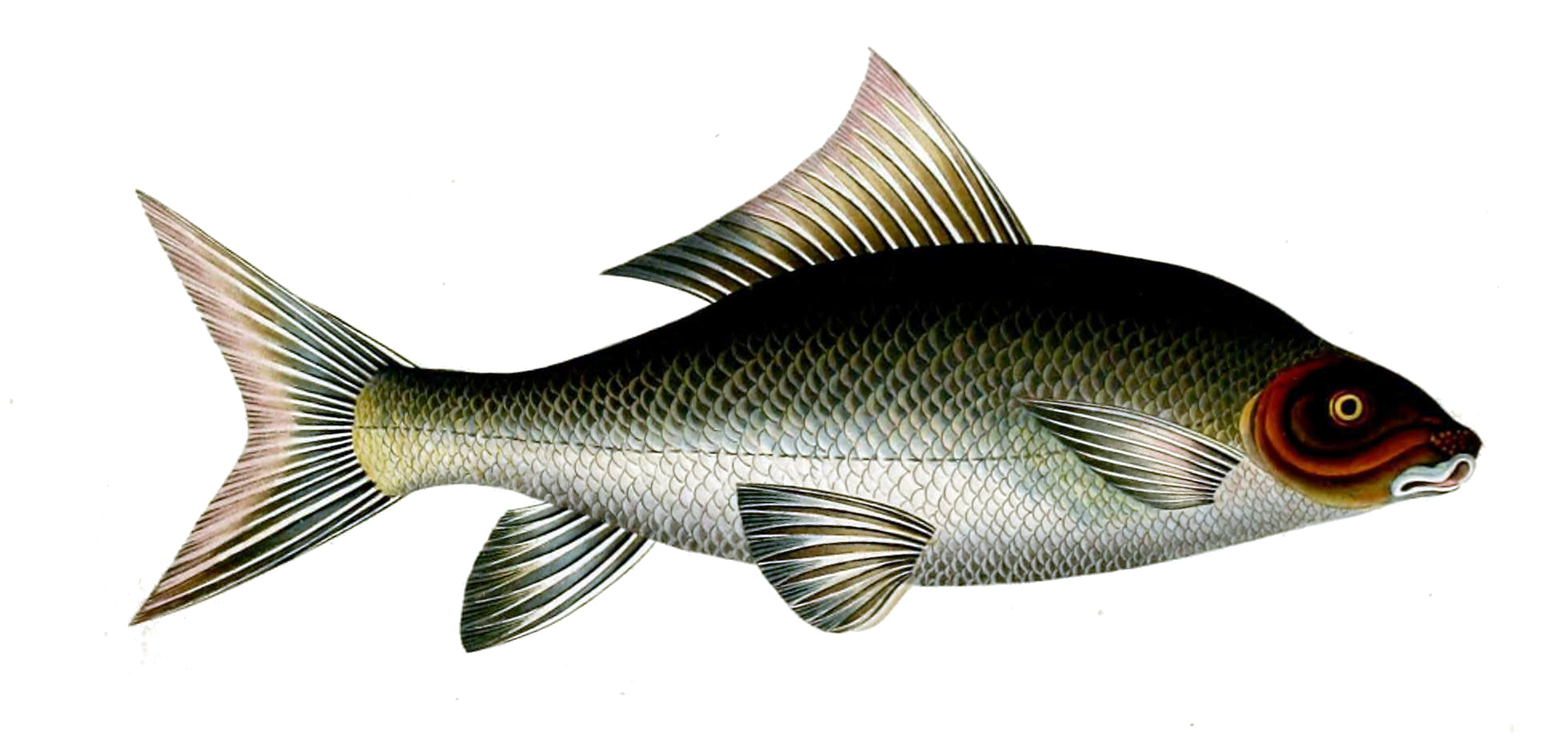

Conservation status
- Least Concern (IUCN 3.1)

Scientific classification
- Kingdom: Animalia
- Phylum: Chordata
- Class: Actinopterygii
- Order: Cypriniformes
- Family: Cyprinidae
- Subfamily: Labeoninae
- Genus: Labeo
- Species: L. fimbriatus

Binomial name
- Labeo fimbriatus (Bloch, 1795)

Synonyms
- Cyprinus fimbriatus Bloch, 1795; Cirrhinus fimbriatus (Bloch, 1795); Rohita fimbriata (Bloch, 1795); Cyprinus nancar Hamilton, 1822; Cirrhinus nancar (Hamilton, 1822); Varicorhinus bobree Sykes, 1839; Leuciscus bobree (Sykes, 1839)

= Fringed-lipped peninsula carp =

Species of fish

The fringed-lipped peninsula carp (Labeo fimbriatus) is a cyprinid fish in genus Labeo from Pakistan, India, Nepal, Bangladesh and Myanmar. It is listed as Least Concern in the global IUCN Red List of threatened species.
