= Wardha Valley Coalfield =

Coal mine in Maharashtra, India

- Location in Maharashtra
- Location: Maharashtra, India; 19°58′34″N 79°05′17″E
- Company: Western Coalfields Limited
- Website: http://westerncoal.gov.in/

Wardha Valley Coalfield is located mainly in Chandrapur district in the Vidarbha region of the Indian state of Maharashtra.

== The coalfield ==
Wardha Valley Coalfied covers an area of about 4,130 km^{2} in the valley of the Wardha, a river in the Godavari basin. It extends in a North West – South East direction for about 115 km. Wardha Valley Coalfield is spread across Bhandar, new majri, Rajur-wani, Chandrapur, Ballarpur and Wamanpalli.

=== Challenges ===
Wardha Valley Coalfield mines coal in a large measure by open cast mining. However, the availability of coal comparatively near to the surface is fast depleting. As a result, either the open cast mines have to be deepened or the costlier underground mining process resorted to.

== Reserves ==
Coal-bearing areas in India are divided into two groups – Gondwana measures and tertiary measures. Gondwana coals occur in valleys of rivers such as Damodar, Mahanadi, Godavari and Wardha. Tertiary coals are found in Assam and the lignite occurring areas.

According to the Geological Survey of India, Wardha Valley Coalfield has total reserves of 5,343.60 million tonnes of non-coking coal, up to a depth of 1,200 m, out of which 2,783.51 million tonnes are proved reserves and the rest being indicated or inferred. Bulk of the coal lies up to a depth of 300 m.
