= Kashypi Dam =

- Location within Maharashtra
- Official name: Kashypi Dam D03105
- Location: Rajapur
- Coordinates: 20.0692741°N 73.6012318°E
- Opening date: 1998
- Owners: Government of Maharashtra, India

Dam and spillways
- Type of dam: Earthfill
- Impounds: Kashyapi river
- Height: 41.75 m (137.0 ft)
- Length: 1,291 m (4,236 ft)
- Dam volume: 0.002761 km^{3} (0.000662 cu mi)

Reservoir
- Total capacity: 0.05269 km^{3} (0.01264 cu mi)
- Surface area: 46.1 km^{2} (17.8 sq mi)

Kashypi Dam, is an earthfill dam on Kashyapi river near Rajapur, Nashik district in the state of Maharashtra in India.

== Specifications ==
The height of the dam above the lowest foundation is 41.75 m (137.0 ft) while the length is 1,380 m (4,530 ft). The volume content is 0.05174 km^{3} (0.01241 cu mi) and gross storage capacity is 0.05269 km^{3} (0.01264 cu mi).

Downstream of this dam is the Gangapur Dam which opened in 1965. Due to silt deposition in the reservoir area, the storage capacity of the Gangapur Dam has gradually reduced. The right side canal running towards Nashik is also closed due to the high civilization in the area. For these two reasons, the Kashypi Dam was constructed.

== Purpose ==
- Irrigation

== See also ==
- Dams in Maharashtra
- List of reservoirs and dams in India
