= Pench Kanhan Coalfield =

Coalfield in Madhya Pradesh, India

- Location in Madhya Pradesh
- Location: Madhya Pradesh, India; 22°12′50″N 78°44′49″E
- Company: Western Coalfields Limited
- Website: http://westerncoal.gov.in/
- Acquired: 1985

Pench Kanhan Coalfield is located in Chhindwara District in the Indian state of Madhya Pradesh.

== History ==
In 1845, the earliest systematic exploration of India’s coal resources was initiated by D.H.Williams, Geological Surveyor of the East India Company. In 1924, Dr. Cyril Fox surveyed once again certain coal-bearing areas, including the Pench, Kanhan and Tawa Valleys.

The collieries in Pench Kanhan Coalfield were owned by several companies and owners such as Amalgamated Coalfields Limited, Pench Valley Coal Company, N.H.Ojha & Co., J.A.Trivedi Brothers, Newton Chikli Collieries (Private) Ltd., S.C.Kambata (Pvt) Ltd., Oriental Coal Co. Ltd., Sial Ghogri Group and The Jamai Majri Coal Co. Ltd. These were nationalized in 1973.

== The coalfield ==
Satpura Coalfields are located in northern Chhindwara and Betul Districts, south of the Narmada. Three rivers flow through the area - Pench, Kanhan and Tawa. There are four coalfields in these valleys – Pench Kanhan Valley Coalfield, Mohpani Coalfield, Tawa Valley Coalfield and Pathakhera Coalfield. Outside the Damodar Valley, Satpura Gondwana Basin is the only area where coking coal is found in India.

The Pench Kanhan Valley Coalfield is situated 30 km (19 mi) to the northwest of Chhindwara. While Pench Valley has five seams in a column of 50-80 m thickness, the coal belt in the Kanhan valley stretches for about 25 km (16 mi). In the Pench valley, except for seam no I, the other seams occur in patches.

Important collieries in the Pench valley are: Newton, Chikli, Borkuhi, Ramanwara, Eklahera, Bamori, North Chandameta, Chandameta, East Dongar Chikli, Ambara Sukri, Datla and Shivpuri. Important coalfields in the Kanhan valley are: Rakhikhol, Danwa, Kalichappar and Nandan. There is a virgin area to the north.

According to the Geological Survey of India, total reserves of coal (including proven, indicated and inferred) in the Pench Kanhan Coalfield is 2,411.28 million tonnes. Out this 657.39 million tonnes is medium coking coal, of which 347.06 million tonnes is available up to a depth of 300 m and another 310.33 million tonnes between 300 and 600 m. Total reserves of non-coking coal in the field is 1,753.89 million tonnes, of which 1,254.83 million tonnes is available up to a depth of 300 m, and another 499.06 million tonnes between 300 and 600 m.
