= Malanjkhand =

Copper mine in Madhya Pradesh, India

Coordinates: 22°00′05″N 80°42′33″E

Malanjkhand also referred to as MCP (acronym for Malanjkhand Copper Project) is a copper mine in India, located near the town of Balaghat to Malajkhand, Madhya Pradesh State. It is close to the Kanha National Park and is the largest base metal mine in India. The Closepet series of the Dharwarian formation is prominent there. It is the main source of copper to Malanjkhand Copper plant functioning there. Besides copper, quartzite, copper pyrite and manganiferous rocks are other important mineral sources found in Malanjkhand. The place is home to about 10,000 people. MCP although a small place has social communities from all parts of India: Maharashtra, Bengal, Kerala, Andhra, Bihar, and others. They have groups which are more popularly referred to as Samaj.

== Malanjkhand Copper Project ==
Malanjkhand Copper Project was inaugurated by Prime Minister Smt. Indira Gandhi in 1982 and Hindustan Copper Limited started to exploit the copper ore through open pit mining. Geological Survey of India took systematic geological exploration at this deposit during 1969. Mining lease of the ore was granted to Hindustan Copper Limited in 1973. With advancement of time this project was enhanced with viable operational developments. It was the largest open cast mining in Asia. In 2025, HCL announced that Malanjkhand had completed the transition from open-pit to fully underground mining.

This area is the result of many cycles of erosion on the gneiss base during the Amgaon Orogeny.

The concentrator plant the project has also been provided with auxiliary facilities such as Tailings Disposal and Water Reclamation System, repair shops, Maintenance Garage, Water Treatment Plant, Warehouses, Fuelling Stations, 132 kV power sub-station, Waste Treatment Facilities and township with modern amenities.
