= K. Raghava =

Indian film producer (1913 – 2018)

- Born: Kotipalli Raghava; December 9, 1913; Kotipalli, East Godavari district, Madras Presidency, British India
- Died: July 31, 2018 (aged 104); Hyderabad, India
- Occupations: Film producer, stunt master, actor
- Employer: Pratap Arts Productions
- Spouse: Hamsarani
- Children: Prasanthi, Pratap Mohan
- Awards: Raghupathi Venkaiah Award

Kotipalli Raghava (9 December 1913 – 31 July 2018), popularly known as K. Raghava, was an Indian film producer known for his work in Telugu cinema. He began his career in the film industry during the silent film era and went on to become a prominent producer, eventually founding the production company Pratap Arts Productions. Over the course of his career, Raghava produced 30 films across multiple languages, including 28 in Telugu, one film each in Hindi and Tamil.

Raghava's notable works include films such as Thatha Manavadu (1973), Samsaram Sagaram (1974), Chaduvu Samskaram (1975), Toorpu Padamara (1976), Surya Chandrulu (1978), Intlo Ramayya Veedhilo Krishnayya (1982), and Tarangini (1982). In addition to his work as a producer, Raghava played a crucial role in launching the careers of prominent directors like Dasari Narayana Rao and Kodi Ramakrishna. His contributions to Telugu cinema were widely recognized, culminating in the prestigious Raghupathi Venkaiah Award in 2009 for his lifelong service to the industry.

== Early life ==
Raghava was born on 9 December 1913 in a poor family in Kotipalli, near Kakinada, in present-day Andhra Pradesh.

== Career ==
At the age of eight, Raghava ran away from home following a fight with his father and joined the East India Film Company in Calcutta as a trolley puller for three years. His first assignment in the film industry was working on the film Bhakta Prahlada (1932). Then, he moved to Vijayawada and worked at Maruthi Talkies, the first theatre established in the Telugu States.

After a few years, Raghava worked in various roles, including as an assistant to producer Motilal Chamria, and filmmaker Raghupathi Venkaiah Naidu. He also assisted popular narrator Kasturi Siva Rao in reading out scripts to the audience at a time when movies did not have an audio system. He also worked as a cleaner for Tanguturi Prakasam. Raghava secured a stable job working for the Maharaja of Mirzapur at Sobhanachala Studios, who produced films like Bheeshma (1944) and Palnati Yuddham (1947). After the death of director Gudavalli Ramabrahmam during the production of Palnati Yuddham, Raghava played a crucial role in suggesting L. V. Prasad to complete the remaining portions of the film, cementing his reputation for meticulous planning and discipline in film production.

Later, he took on stunt roles in films such as Pathala Bhairavi (1951) and Raju Peda (1954). Raghava’s significant career breakthrough came when he joined Gemini Studios, where he acted in small roles and performed stunts. His expertise in multiple languages caught the attention of MGM Studios, who hired him as the production manager for the English-language film Tarzan Goes to India (1962). This role took him to Rome, and he earned a substantial payment of $20,000 for his work.

=== Film production ===
Inspired by the films like Sugar Colt (1967) and Death Rides a Horse (1967) which he watched during his time in Rome, Raghava decided to venture into film production. His collaboration with K. Balachander led to the adaptation of the latter's play Major Chandrakanth into the film Sukha Dukhalu (1968). With the money he saved, Raghava partnered with Ekamreswara Rao and Surya Chandra to establish Falguna Films. Their first production was Jagath Kiladeelu (1969), a major success, followed by films like Jagath Jettilu (1970) and Jagath Jenthrilu (1971). Later, he started producing films independently under the banner of Pratap Art Productions, named after his son Pratap. Raghava produced 27 films under the banners Falguna Pictures and Pratap Arts, with most of them becoming commercial successes. His work included producing films in multiple languages, such as the Hindi film Itni Si Baat (1981) and the Tamil film Minor Mappillai (1996).

Raghava was instrumental in launching the careers of several iconic figures in the Telugu film industry. He introduced filmmakers such as Dasari Narayana Rao (Thatha Manavadu), Kodi Ramakrishna (Intlo Ramayya Veedhilo Krishnayya), Rajasri (Chaduvu Samskaram), and others. He is also credited with giving Konidela Venkata Rao, the father of Chiranjeevi, a role in Jagath Kiladeelu.

Raghava played a pivotal role in establishing the Telugu film industry in Hyderabad after its relocation from Madras (now Chennai). He collaborated with industry stalwarts like N. T. Rama Rao, Akkineni Nageswara Rao, and Rama Naidu to develop the film infrastructure in Hyderabad. Raghava set up Pratap Dubbing Theatre and was a key figure in the development of Film Nagar, which became a major hub for the Telugu film industry.

== Personal life ==
Raghava married Hamsarani, the sister of prominent producer M. K. Radha from Pondicherry. The couple had two children, a daughter named Prasanthi and a son named Pratap Mohan. Raghava could speak about eight languages. He died on 31 July 2018 at the age of 104 due to a heart attack in Hyderabad.

== Filmography ==
Producer

- Sukha Dukhalu (1968)
- Jagath Kiladeelu (1969)
- Jagath Jettilu (1970)
- Jagath Jenthrilu (1971)
- Thatha-Manavadu (1973)
- Samsaram Sagaram (1974)
- Chaduvu Samskaram (1975)
- Toorpu Padamara (1976)
- Surya Chandrulu (1978)
- Anthuleni Vinthakatha (1979)
- Itni Si Baat (1981)
- Intlo Ramayya Veedhilo Krishnayya (1982)
- Tarangini (1982)
- Triveni Sangamam (1983)
- Ee Prasnaku Baduledi? (1986)
- Yugakartalu (1987)
- Ankitham (1990)
- Minor Mappillai (1996) (Tamil)

Stunt master

- Palnati Yuddham (1947)
- Pathala Bhairavi (1951)
- Raju Peda (1954)

Actor

- Bala Nagamma (1942)
- Chandralekha (1948)

== Awards ==
Raghava received numerous awards during his career, including the Nandi Awards for films like Thatha Manavadu (1972) and Samsaram Sagaram (1973). His contribution to Telugu cinema earned him the title Cine Bhishma, reflecting his patriarchal role in the industry.

Raghava was honoured with the Raghupathi Venkaiah Award in 2009 for his contributions to the Telugu film industry.
