= Lakshmi Narasimha Temple, Antarvedi =

Hindu Temple in Antarvedi, India

- Sri Lakshmi Narasimha Swamy Devasthanam; 5th Nava Narasimha Temple
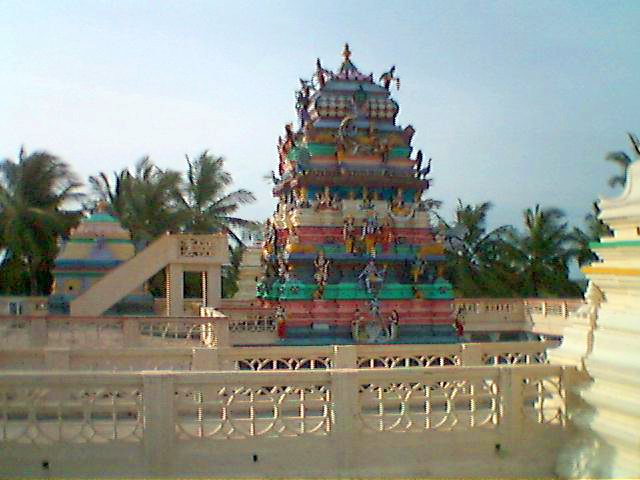

- Location in Andhra Pradesh, India

Religion
- Affiliation: Hinduism
- District: Konaseema district
- Deity: Sri Lakshmi Narasimha Swamy Rajyalakshmi
- Festivals: Bheeshma Ekadasi, Ratha Saptami, Kartika Pournami, Vaikunta Ekadasi

Location
- Location: Antarvedi
- State: Andhra Pradesh
- Country: India
- Coordinates: 16.3333°N 81.7333°E

Architecture
- Creator: Koppanathi Krishnamma
- Completed: Shalivahana Saka 1745 (1823 A.D)
- Inscriptions: Shali Vahana Saka Years [1745] 1823 AD, Swabhanu nama samvatsaradhika Chaitra Krishna Dashami, Bhanu Vanara

Lakshmi Narasimha Temple is a Hindu temple in Antarvedi, Sakhinetipalle mandal, Konaseema district, Andhra Pradesh, India. The temple is situated at the place where the Bay of Bengal and Vashista Godavari, a tributary of the Godavari River, meet. It was built in the 15th and 16th centuries.

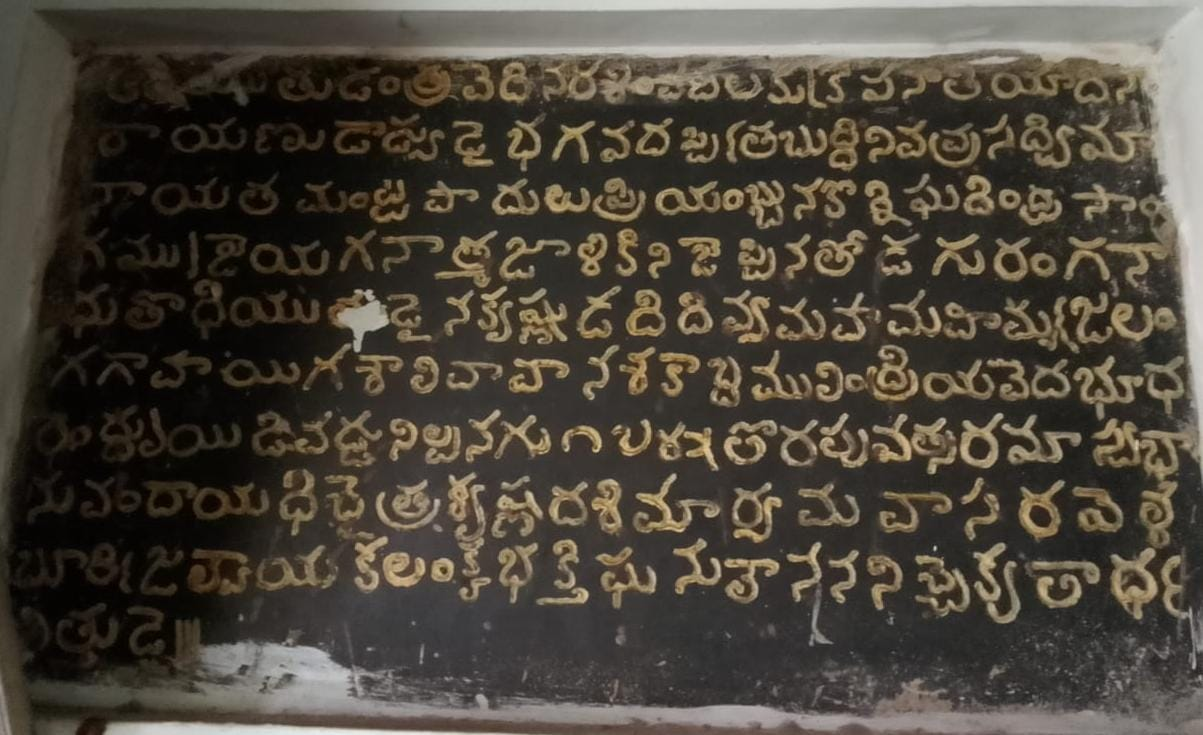
Stone inscription at Lakshmi Narasimha Temple.

== History ==
The temple was built by Kopanathi Krishnamma, .

=== Inscription of Navada Lothpala Malika ===
This stone inscription pertains to Navada Lothpala Malika. The inscription notes that the work on the temple was completed on the day of Chaitra Krishna Dashami in the Swabhanu year, referred to as Bhanu Vanara.

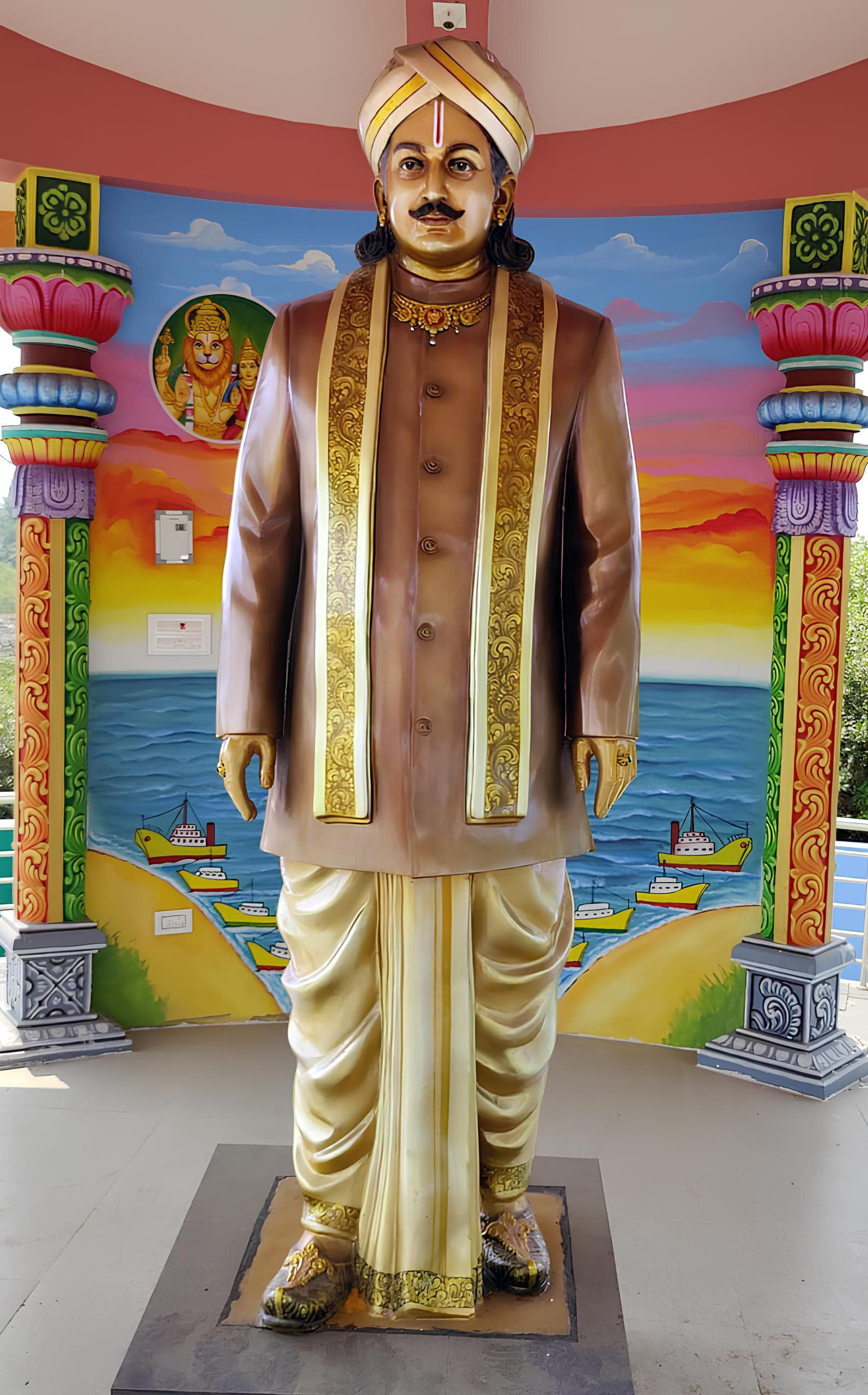
Kopanathi Krishnamma, the founder of Lakshmi Narasimha Temple.

== Travel ==
There are three ways that one can travel to Antarvedi. Steam launches are available. Alternatively, one can ride on the ferry, upon reaching Sakhinetipalli and from there start for Antarvedi by road. The third option is to cross the Chinchinada using the newly built bridge, and travel the rest of the way by road. A launch pad allows visitors to land on the small island at the other side of the Godavari River - from this point, travel can then be undertaken to the convergence point of the river and the ocean.

== Festivals ==
Prominent festivals celebrated in the temple include:

- Kalyanamohasthavam (Magha Sudha Sapthami to Magha Bahula Padyami)
- Sri Venkateswara Swamy kalyanam (Jesta Sudha Ekadasi)
- Sri Narasimha Jayanthi (Vaisakha Sudha Chaturdasi)
