= Intlo Ramayya Veedhilo Krishnayya =

Intlo Ramayya Veedilo Krishnayya
- Theatrical release poster
- Directed by: Kodi Ramakrishna
- Written by: Kodi Ramakrishna (Story & screenplay); Gollapudi Maruthi Rao (Dialogues)
- Produced by: K. Raghava
- Starring: Chiranjeevi; Madhavi; Gollapudi Maruthi Rao
- Cinematography: S. S. Lal
- Edited by: K. Balu
- Music by: J. V. Raghavulu
- Production company: Pratap Art Productions
- Release date: 22 April 1982
- Running time: 135 min
- Country: India
- Language: Telugu

Intlo Ramayya Veedilo Krishnayya (transl. 'Rama at home, Krishna on the streets') is a 1982 Indian Telugu-language film directed by Kodi Ramakrishna in his directorial debut. The film stars Chiranjeevi, Madhavi, and features Gollapudi Maruthi Rao in his acting debut, alongside Poornima and Sangeeta in key roles. Produced by K. Raghava, the film's music was composed by J. V. Raghavulu.

Released on 22 April 1982, the film was widely praised for its engaging storyline and the strong performances of its cast, particularly Chiranjeevi and Gollapudi Maruthi Rao. Intlo Ramayya Veedhilo Krishnayya became a major box-office success.

The film’s popularity led to remakes in other languages: Veetula Raman Veliyila Krishnan in Tamil (1983), Maneli Ramanna Beedheeli Kamanna in Kannada (1983), and Ghar Mein Ram Gali Mein Shyam in Hindi (1988).

== Synopsis ==
Rajasekharam, a civil engineer, who moves to a village and falls in love with Jaya Lakshmi. After their marriage, they relocate to the city, where they begin their new life. However, their happiness is disrupted when their neighbour, Subba Rao, develops a lust in Jaya Lakshmi and begins causing trouble for the couple. The film explores how Rajasekharam and Jaya Lakshmi confront and resolve the challenges posed by Subba Rao, leading to a satisfying conclusion.

== Cast ==
- Chiranjeevi as Rajasekharam
- Madhavi as Jaya Lakshmi
- Gollapudi Maruthi Rao as Subba Rao [debut as an actor]
- Poornima as Veerasathya Varaprasadha Mangala Durga Gnana Prasoona Mangathayaru (Chitti Thalli)
- Sangeeta
- Annapoorna
- P. L. Narayana
- Bheemeswara Rao as Dasaratha Ramayya
- Gaadiraju Subba Rao
- Hanuman Reddy
- Kakinada Syamala
- Vijayalakshmi
- Jayaseela
- Girija Rani

== Production ==
=== Development ===
Intlo Ramayya Veedhilo Krishnayya marked the directorial debut of Kodi Ramakrishna, who had previously worked as an assistant to filmmaker Dasari Narayana Rao. Ramakrishna initially created a script for the film Tarangini, produced by K. Raghava, but the project was eventually dropped. After six months of reworking, Ramakrishna developed the script for Intlo Ramayya Veedhilo Krishnayya, which was approved by producer K. Raghava.

=== Casting ===
Producer K. Raghava typically preferred working with lesser-known actors, but Ramakrishna had Chiranjeevi in mind for the lead role. Despite Raghava’s inclination towards new faces, Ramakrishna approached Chiranjeevi, who initially expressed reservations, believing the role was better suited for actor Chandra Mohan. After a late-night script narration, Chiranjeevi was convinced to take the role.

Ramakrishna's collaboration with writer Gollapudi Maruthi Rao began through casual encounters during morning walks. Gollapudi Maruthi Rao initially assisted Ramakrishna in narrating the story to K. Raghava. Once the story was approved, Raghava insisted on Maruthi Rao playing the role of Subba Rao. Though initially hesitant, Maruthi Rao agreed after Ramakrishna’s persistence. This film marked Gollapudi Maruthi Rao's acting debut.

=== Filming ===
The majority of the shooting for Intlo Ramayya Veedhilo Krishnayya took place in Palakollu and its surrounding areas. The climax of the film was shot in Chiranjeevi's house and in Antarvedi, located at the point where the Godavari River meets the Bay of Bengal. An iconic scene involving a boat journey in the climax was also filmed in Antarvedi. During the shooting of the climax at Chiranjeevi's house, his daughter, Sushmita, was born.

A humorous off-screen anecdote also mirrors a key plot point in the film. Just as the characters of Chiranjeevi and Madhavi experience a misunderstanding in the story, the actors themselves had a similar misunderstanding during the shooting. Their differences were only resolved toward the end of the film's production.

=== Censorship issues ===
The film faced censorship challenges, particularly with Ramalakshmi Arudra, a jury member of the Censor Board at the time. She objected to the film's title, suggesting it could be changed to Intlo Yesu Veedhilo Allah (transl. 'Jesus at home, Allah on the streets'), and criticized the portrayal of the character Sangeeta, claiming it depicted women negatively. She recommended removing two songs, both versions of the title track. The film was submitted to the Censor Board a total of 25 times before the issue was resolved.

Eventually, after a change in the board's jury, the film received approval with the condition that certain scenes be cut. Although producer K. Raghava was opposed to making changes, Ramakrishna agreed to remove one scene to secure the certificate. The film was released the following day.

== Music ==
The music for the film was composed by J. V. Raghavulu, and the lyrics were written by C. Narayana Reddy.

Track list
No.	Title	Lyrics	Singer(s)	Length
1.	"Oka Vanitha Nava Muditha"	C. Narayana Reddy	S. P. Balasubrahmanyam	4:05
2.	"Vache Vache Vaana Jallu"	C. Narayana Reddy	S. P. Balasubrahmanyam, P. Suseela	3:21
3.	"Intlo Ramayya Veedhilo Krishnayya"	C. Narayana Reddy	S. P. Balasubrahmanyam	4:34
4.	"Swamiye Saranam Ayyappa"	C. Narayana Reddy	S. P. Balasubrahmanyam	3:22
5.	"Sitaa Raamula Adarsam"	C. Narayana Reddy	S. P. Balasubrahmanyam, P. Suseela	4:32
6.	"Palikedhi Vedha Manthram"	C. Narayana Reddy	S. P. Balasubrahmanyam, P. Suseela	3:00

== Reception ==
Intlo Ramayya Veedhilo Krishnayya was a major commercial success. It had a 50-day run in 8 centres and 100-day run in two centres.

== Remakes ==
The film was later remade in Tamil as Veetula Raman Veliyila Krishnan (1983), in Kannada as Maneli Ramanna Beedheeli Kamanna (1983) and in Hindi as Ghar Mein Ram Gali Mein Shyam (1988).
