= Jagath Kiladeelu =

1969 Telugu film by I. N. Murthy

Jagath Kiladilu
- Directed by: I. N. Murthy
- Screenplay by: I. N. Murthy
- Story by: Viswaprasad
- Produced by: P. Ekamreswara Rao; K. Raghava
- Dialogues by: Viswaprasad
- Starring: Krishna; Vanisri; Gummadi; S. V. Ranga Rao; Rao Gopal Rao
- Cinematography: M. Kannappa
- Edited by: N. S. Prakasam; K. Balu
- Music by: S. P. Kodandapani
- Production company: Falguna Productions
- Release date: 25 July 1969
- Country: India
- Language: Telugu

Jagath Kiladilu is a 1969 Indian Telugu-language crime thriller film directed by I. N. Murthy and produced by P. Ekamreswara Rao and K. Raghava under the banner of Falguna Productions. Featuring Krishna, Vanisri, S. V. Ranga Rao, Gummadi, and Rao Gopal Rao in prominent roles, the film's story and dialogues were penned by noted detective novelist Viswaprasad. Praised for its narrative and performances, the film was a commercial success upon its release.

== Plot ==
Zamindar Raja Rao lives with his wife Syamala Devi. They have a son Anand, who resides in America. The family guards a secret about an ancestral treasure, known only to Raja Rao, Syamala Devi, and Anand. A notorious bandit, Bhayankar, learns of the treasure and murders Raja Rao, imprisoning Syamala Devi in a hidden cave to gain access to the treasure. Detective Sinha investigates Bhayankar's crimes.

Returning to India after his father's murder, Anand searches for his mother while avoiding a kidnapping attempt by Bhayankar. He is provided refuge in Sinha's home, where he is cared for by Sinha's mother Bharati Devi and sister Santhi. Anand and Santhi develop a romantic relationship.

The narrative takes a turn when Rowdy Rangadu, a local ruffian who opposes Bhayankar's activities, is revealed to be CID officer Gangaram working undercover. Bhayankar kills Sinha and impersonates him to mislead authorities. The plot unfolds as Anand and Gangaram join forces to confront Bhayankar and his gang. The film concludes with Bhayankar's arrest and Anand marrying Santhi, while the heroes are celebrated for their bravery.

== Cast ==
- Krishna as Anand
- Vanisri as Santhi
- S. V. Ranga Rao as Rowdy Rangadu / CID Gangaram
- Gummadi as Detective Sinha
- Rao Gopal Rao as Bhayankar
- G. Varalakshmi as Syamala Devi
- Prabhakar Reddy as Police Commissioner
- Kasinath Tata as Zamindar Raja Rao
- Malathi as Bharathi Devi
- Raja Babu
- Vijaya Lalitha
- Arja Janardhana Rao

== Production ==
=== Development ===
K. Raghava, a veteran of the Indian film industry, worked as the production manager for MGM's Tarzan Goes to India (1962), a role that took him to Rome, where he earned $20,000. Inspired by films like Sugar Colt (1966) and Death Rides a Horse (1967) during his time in Rome, Raghava decided to venture into film production, aiming to make Telugu films similar to those he had watched. He collaborated with Ekamreswara Rao, with whom he had previously worked on Sukha Dukhalu (1968), and Surya Chandra to establish Falguna Films. Their first production under this banner was Jagath Kiladeelu.

The film was made on a budget of ₹4 lakh. Directed by I. N. Murthy, who also wrote the screenplay, the story and dialogues were penned by Viswaprasad, a noted writer of detective novels. S. P. Kodandapani composed the music, and cinematography was handled by Kannappa.

=== Casting ===
Producer Raghava gave an advance to Krishna to act in Jagath Kiladeelu during his wedding with Vijaya Nirmala in Tirupati. Initially, Akkineni Nageswara Rao was approached for the role of Rowdy Rangadu. After Nageswara Rao declined, Raghava turned to S. V. Ranga Rao, who accepted the role.

Rao Gopal Rao was cast in the role of the bandit Bhayankar, but his voice was dubbed by another artist for the film, as the producers felt it did not suit the character. Despite initial concerns, his dubbed voice later became iconic, particularly after his performance in Mutyala Muggu (1975).

During production, Raghava cast Konidela Venkata Rao, father of actor Chiranjeevi, in the role of an inspector. According to Raghava, Venkata Rao, who was a police officer, visited the film's set in his khaki uniform and requested a role. This led to his casting as an inspector in the film.

=== Filming ===
The principal photography of the film commenced on 10 January 1969.

== Music ==
The soundtrack was composed by S. P. Kodandapani with lyrics by Devulapalli Krishnasastri, Kosaraju, and Viswaprasad. The songs became popular for their melodious compositions and relevant themes.

Track list
No.	Title	Lyrics	Singer(s)	Length
1.	"Egire Pavurama"	Devulapalli Krishnasastri	P. Suseela
2.	"Ekkadanna Bava"	Kosaraju	S. P. Balasubrahmanyam, Vijayalakshmi Kanna Rao
3.	"Kiladilu Lokamanta"	Kosaraju	P. Suseela
4.	"Velachusthe Sandevela"	Devulapalli Krishnasastri	P. Suseela, S. P. Balasubrahmanyam
5.	"Na Andam Ee Chandam"	Viswaprasad	L. R. Eswari

== Reception ==
The film received positive reviews, with praise for the performances of the cast. The screenplay, direction, and music were also well received.

Vijaya of Visalaandhra praised the director's efforts in introducing crime films to Indian cinema while enhancing technical standards. The performance of S. V. Ranga Rao was also highly commended.

Jagath Kiladeelu became a commercial success. Its success helped establish Phalguna Films and solidified the partnership of K. Raghava and Ekamreswara Rao, paving the way for their next hit Jagath Jettilu (1970).

== Legacy ==
The catchphrases "Jhate" and "Gutle," used by S. V. Ranga Rao's character, became popular and were widely adopted in everyday conversations.
