= Karune Illada Kanoonu =

1983 film by K. S. L. Swamy

- Directed by: K. S. L. Swamy (Ravee)
- Based on: Major Chandrakanth by K. Balachander
- Produced by: Girija
- Starring: Lokesh; Tiger Prabhakar; Sripriya; Ashok
- Cinematography: B. Purushottham
- Edited by: N. M. Victor
- Music by: Shankar–Ganesh
- Production company: Sri Chamundeshwari
- Distributed by: Sri Chamundeshwari
- Release date: 25 November 1983
- Country: India
- Language: Kannada

Karune Illada Kanoonu ( transl. Merciless Law) is a 1983 Indian Kannada-language film, directed by K. S. L. Swamy (Ravee) and produced by Girija. The film stars Lokesh, Tiger Prabhakar, Sripriya and Ashok, with music by Shankar–Ganesh. It is an adaptation of K. Balachander's play Major Chandrakanth.

== Cast ==
- Lokesh
- Tiger Prabhakar
- Sripriya as Kavitha
- Ashok in Special Appearance
- Shivaram
- Chandrashekar
- Sudheer
- Balagangadhara Thilak
- Shivaprakash
- Ashwath Narayan
- Saikumar
- Tomato Somu
- Veerendra Kumar
- Pranavamurthy
- Ramesh
- Kokila

== Soundtrack ==
The music was composed by Shankar–Ganesh.

Song	Singers	Lyrics	Length (m:ss)
"Hareyada Cheluva Hoove"	Vani Jairam, S. P. Balasubrahmanyam	R. N. Jayagopal	04:55
"Neenu Thandantha Raaga"	Vani Jairam	R. N. Jayagopal	04:20
"Thangiya Maduveya Madona"	S. P. Balasubrahmanyam	Doddarange Gowda	04:11
"Dhairyave Himalaya"	P. B. Sreenivas	P. B. Sreenivas	04:17
"Beladingala Holeyali"	Vani Jairam	S. U. Rudramurthy Shastry	05:01
