= Oonche Log =

Oonche Log (transl. Exalted people/upper class) may refer to these Indian Hindi-language films:

- Oonche Log (1965 film), by Phani Majumdar
- Oonche Log (1985 film)
