= Nandi Awards of 1973 =

Indian Telugu film and TV awards ceremony

The Nandi Awards were presented annually by the Government of Andhra Pradesh, India to recognise excellence in Telugu cinema. The first awards were presented in 1964. The following won the best films awards in 1973.

== 1973 Nandi Awards Winners List ==
Category	Winner	Film
Best Feature Film	K. Viswanath	Sarada
Second Best Feature Film	Bapu	Andala Ramudu
Third Best Feature Film	Dasari Narayana Rao	Samsaram Sagaram
