= Sakhinetipalli =

Village in Andhra Pradesh, India

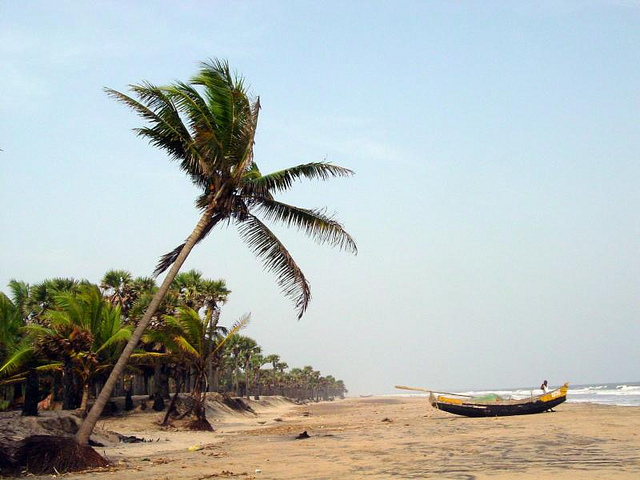
- Antarvedi Beach view
- Interactive map of Sakhinetipalli
- Location in Andhra Pradesh, India Sakhinetipalli (India)
- Coordinates: 16.4138°N 81.7445°E
- Country: India
- State: Andhra Pradesh
- District: Dr. B.R. Ambedkar Konaseema
- Talukas: Sakhinetipalli, Razole

Population (12/31/2001)
  - Total: 15,720

Languages
  - Official: Telugu
- Time zone: UTC+5:30 (IST)
- PIN: 533251
- Telephone code: 08862
- Vehicle Registration: AP05 (Former); AP39 (from 30 January 2019)
- Nearest city: Narsapuram

Sakhinetipalli is a village in Sakhinetipalle mandal in Dr. B. R. Ambedkar Konaseema district, Andhra Pradesh, India. The village is one of the three important Ferry points for Sakhinetipalli-Narasapuram. The other two are Kotipalli-Mukteswaram and Bodasakurru-Pasarlapudi in the Konaseema region.
