= Thoorpu Padamara =

1976 film by Dasari Narayana Rao

- Poster
- Directed by: Dasari Narayana Rao
- Screenplay by: Dasari Narayana Rao
- Based on: Apoorva Raagangal by K. Balachander
- Produced by: K. Raghava
- Starring: Narasimha Raju; Srividya; Madhavi; Kaikala Satyanarayana
- Cinematography: K. S. Mani
- Edited by: K. Balu
- Music by: Ramesh Naidu
- Production company: Pratap Art Productions
- Release date: 23 October 1976
- Country: India
- Language: Telugu

Thoorpu Padamara (transl. East and West) is a 1976 Indian Telugu-language romantic drama film written and directed by Dasari Narayana Rao. A remake of the Tamil film Apoorva Raagangal (1975), it revolves around a rebel (Narasimha Raju) who falls in love with a much older woman (Srividya) while the woman's daughter (Madhavi) is drawn to the rebel's father (Kaikala Satyanarayana). The rest of the story revolves around the four characters and their problems. The film was released on 23 October 1976 and became a commercial success.

== Plot ==
Suryam, a young rebel, is nursed back to health by a lonely classical singer Sivaranjani, who is significantly older than him. Though the two fall in love and want to be together, they find many obstacles in their paths.

== Cast ==
- Narasimha Raju as Suryam
- Srividya as Sivaranjani
- Madhavi as Kalyani
- Kaikala Satyanarayana as Suryam's father
- Mohan Babu as Sivaranjani's ex-husband
- Nagesh as Sivaranjani's family doctor
- C. Narayana Reddy as himself
- Murali Mohan as himself

== Production ==
Thoorpu Padamara, a remake of K. Balachander's Tamil film Apoorva Raagangal (1975), was written and directed by Dasari Narayana Rao. It was produced by K. Raghava under Pratap Art Productions, photographed by K. S. Mani and edited by K. Balu. Srividya and Nagesh reprised their roles from the Tamil original.

== Themes ==
Thoorpu Padamara, like Narayana Rao's other films, explores "human relation dynamics". According to Sridhar Sattiraju of Telugu360, the entire story can be summed in one of the film's dialogues which translates to: "Why the ‘Twain shall never meet, conveyed the essence of what happens when improbable relationships exist between say, a father-in-law and a daughter-in-law or say, a mother-in-law and son-in-law".

== Soundtrack ==
The soundtrack was composed by Ramesh Naidu, and the lyrics were written by C. Narayana Reddy. Instead of reusing the songs from Apoorva Raagangal, Naidu was given freedom by Narayana Rao to compose original songs.

Track listing
No.	Title	Singer(s)	Length
1.	"Shivaranjani"	S. P. Balasubrahmanyam	4:16
2.	"Swaramulu Yedaina"	P. Susheela	4:41
3.	"Thoorupu Padamara"	P. Susheela, Kovela Santha	6:24
4.	"Jathiswaram"	Vani Jairam	1:04
5.	"Navvuthaaru"	S. P. Balasubrahmanyam	2:52
Total length:			19:17

== Release ==
Thoorpu Padamara was released on 23 October 1976, and became a commercial success.
