= Veetula Raman Veliyila Krishnan =

- Title card
- Directed by: Manivannan
- Screenplay by: Manivannan
- Story by: Kodi Ramakrishna
- Produced by: Panchu Arunachalam
- Starring: Sivakumar; Radhika; Suhasini
- Cinematography: Haribabu
- Edited by: K. Kesavakumar
- Music by: Ilaiyaraaja
- Production company: Panchu Movies
- Release date: 12 June 1983
- Running time: 128 minutes
- Country: India
- Language: Tamil

Veetula Raman Veliyila Krishnan (transl. Rama at home, Krishna outdoors) is a 1983 Indian Tamil-language film, directed by Manivannan and produced by Panchu Arunachalam. The film stars Sivakumar, Radhika and Suhasini. It is a remake of the Telugu film Intlo Ramayya Veedhilo Krishnayya, and was released on 12 June 1983.

== Plot ==
Rajasekar arrives in a small village as the government contractor to build a new road and is invited to stay at a man's home. The man's daughter Jayalakshmi, has a short temper and is initially upset at having to give up her room for the guest. She and Rajasekar eventually fall in love with the prodding of Jaya's neighbour Chitti. The two marry and move to the city where they rent a home from prominent businessman Subba Rao. He is widely seen as a pious, generous man but that is an elaborate act. Subba Rao is a rapist and womaniser that uses his saintly image as a cloak to cover his misdeeds. Rajasekar and Jaya are generally very happy together but she often gets jealous of his friendships with women. Although he has never cheated, Rajasekar in turn teases her and feeds into Jaya's insecurities.

Chitti runs away from the village with a man who claimed to be in love with her but has stolen her jewellery and abandoned her pregnant. Rajasekar runs into her in the city and arranges accommodations for her. He does not tell Jaya as he thinks she will disapprove. Once she finds out, she is understanding of his good intentions but asks him to send Chitti home. He agrees but realises she would not be welcomed back and that she is too naïve to truly comprehend the enormity of her situation. Rajasekar asks Subba Rao to house Chitti until he can plan out a more permanent solution. Subba Rao attempts to take advantage of the situation by attempting to rape Chitti but is stopped by Rajasekar. He retaliates by spinning a tale of a torrid affair between Chitti and Rajasekar to Jaya. Given her doubts as well as Rajasekar's lies, Jaya believes this to be true and separates from him. Rajasekar now must overcome Subba Rao's machinations to reunite with Jaya and help Chitti find a good life.

== Cast ==
- Sivakumar as Rajasekar
- Radhika as Jayalakshmi
- Suhasini as Chitti
- M. R. Krishnamurthy as Subba Rao
- C. S. Rao in Guest appearance
- Kallapetti Singaram as Jaya's father
- Loose Mohan as Mottaya
- Jayankondan
- Sivaraman
- Kumari Indira
- S. N. Parvathy as Jaya's mother
- Saroja
- Maya
- Annapoorani
- Rajapriya
- K. R. Krishnan
- Y. Narajanan
- K. R. Shanmugam

== Soundtrack ==
The music was composed by Ilaiyaraaja. Lyrics by Panchu Arunachalam and Gangai Amaran.

Song	Singers	Lyrics	Length
"Aathu Pakkam"	S. P. Sailaja, S. P. Balasubrahmanyam	Gangai Amaran	04:28
"Manamum Gunamum"	S. P. Balasubrahmanyam	Panchu Arunachalam	04:33
"Veetula Raman"	Malaysia Vasudevan	Panchu Arunachalam	03:58
"Yennamma Kobam"	S. P. Balasubrahmanyam	Panchu Arunachalam	04:15

== Reception ==
Kalki praised the acting of Sivakumar, Radhika, Suhasini and Krishnamoorthy.
