= Samsaram Sagaram =

- Directed by: Dasari Narayana Rao
- Written by: Dasari Narayana Rao
- Produced by: K. Raghava
- Starring: Satyanarayana; Jayanthi; M. Prabhakar Reddy; G. Varalakshmi; Kaikala Satyanarayana; Gummadi
- Music by: Ramesh Naidu
- Release date: 1974
- Country: India
- Language: Telugu

Samsaram Sagaram is a 1974 Indian Telugu-language drama film written and directed by Dasari Narayana Rao.The film won two Nandi Awards.

== Cast ==
- Satyanarayana
- Jayanthi
- Rama Prabha
- M. Prabhakar Reddy
- G. Varalakshmi
- Gummadi
- S. V. Ranga Rao
- Baby Rani

== Soundtrack ==
- "Aaja Beta Oh Mere Raja Beta" (Singer: S. P. Balasubrahmanyam)
- "Divvi Divvi Divvitlu Deepavali Divvitlu"
- "Intiki Deepam Illalu Aa Deepakantula Kiranale Pillalu" (Singer: S. P. Balasubrahmanyam)
- "Narayano Narayana Nee Peru Naa Peru Narayana"
- "Samsaram Sagaram Bratuke Oka Navaga Aashe Chukkaniga Payaninche O Navika" (Singer: S. P. Balasubrahmanyam)

== Awards ==
Nandi Awards - 1973

- Third Best Feature Film - Bronze - K. Raghava
- Best Story Writer - Dasari Narayana Rao
