= Antarvedipalem =

- village
- Interactive map of Antarvedipalem
- Location in Andhra Pradesh, India
- Coordinates: 16.3319°N 81.7320°E
- Country: India
- State: Andhra Pradesh
- District: Konaseema
- Mandal: Sakhinetipalle

Population (2011)
  - Total: 14,162

Languages
  - Official: Telugu
- Time zone: UTC+5:30 (IST)
- Postal code: 533 252
- Nearest city: Palakollu

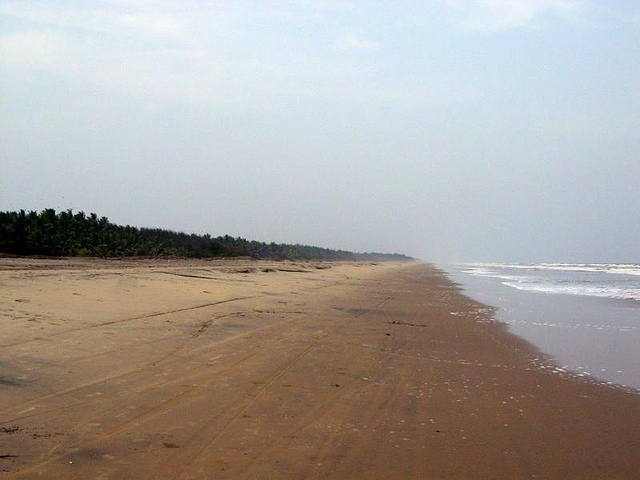
Antarvedi Beach

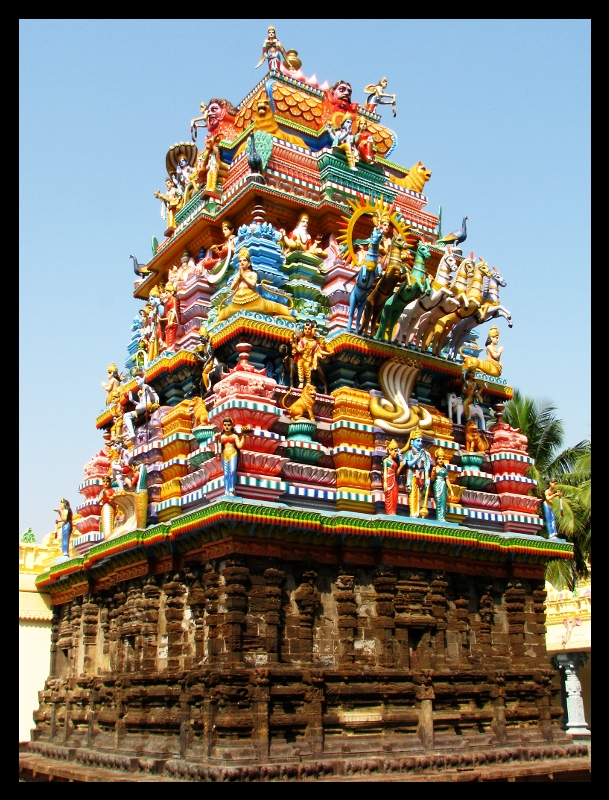
Antarvedi temple

Antarvedipalem is a village in Sakhinetipalle mandal in Konaseema district, Andhra Pradesh, India.

== Geography ==
Antarvedipalem is located at 16.3319°N 81.7320°E. It is located on the west face of the Bay of Bengal.

== Demographics ==
As of Census 2011, Antarvedipalem has a population of 14,162 of which 7,018 were males while 7,144 were females, sex ratio is 1018. Population of children (age 0–6) was 1,118 which makes up 7.89% of total population of village. Literacy rate of the village was 87.03%.
