= Surya Chandrulu =

1978 Telugu film by V. C . Guhanadhan

Surya Chandrulu is a Telugu film released on 1978 under Prathap art production banner. This movie was directed by V. C . Guhanadhan. Chandra Mohan and Vijaya Nirmala played a key role. Ramesh Naidu was music director for this movie .

== Cast ==
- Chandra Mohan
- Vijaya Nirmala
- Kaikala Satyanarayana
- Latha
- Praveena
- Raja Babu
- Rao Gopalrao
- Venkat Rao
- Prabhakar
- J.V. Narayana Rao
- D. Mohan
- Radha Prasad Rao

== Soundtrack ==
All lyrics are written by C. Narayana Reddy.

No.	Title	Singer(s)	Length
1.	"ye Inta Vunnado Ramanna"	S.P. Balasubramaniam, Vijayalakshmi sharma
2.	"Edo Edo Entho Cheppalani"	S.P. Sailaja, S.P. Balasubramaniam
3.	"Oke Manasu Rendu Rupaluga"	S.P. Balasubramaniam, G. Anand
4.	"Mallelu Puche Challani Vela"	S.P. Balasubramaniam
