= Anukoni Prayanam =

South Indian movie

- Theatrical release poster
- Directed by: Venkatesh Pediredla
- Written by: Paruchuri brothers (dialogues)
- Screenplay by: Venkatesh Pediredla
- Story by: Dr. Jagan Mohan D.Y
- Produced by: Dr. Jagan Mohan D.Y
- Starring: Rajendra Prasad; Narasimha Raju
- Cinematography: Mallikarjun Naragani
- Edited by: Ram Tumu
- Music by: S Siva Dinavahi
- Production company: Apple Creations
- Release date: 28 October 2022
- Running time: 118 mins
- Country: India
- Language: Telugu

Anukoni Prayanam (transl. An Unexpected Journey) is 2022 Indian Telugu-language philosophical film, written and directed by Venkatesh Pediredla. It is produced by Jaganmohan DY, under the banner of Apple Creations. The film stars Rajendra Prasad, Narasimha Raju in the lead roles with music composed by S. Siva Dinavahi.

== Cast ==
- Rajendra Prasad as Rajendra
- Narasimha Raju as Ramu
- Ravi Babu as SI
- Subhalekha Sudhakar as Dr.Sudhakar
- Narayana Rao as Veerayya
- Prabhas Sreenu as Thief in Bus
- Mahesh Achanta as Thief in Dhaba
- Thagubothu Ramesh as Drunkard at crematorium
- PD Srinivas as Doctor
- Dhanraj as Nagulu
- Ananth Babu as Astroleger in Bus
- Gemini Suresh as Tempo Driver
- Kancharapalem Kishore
- Jogi brothers as Villagers playing Snakes & ladders
- Prema as Gayatri
- Tulasi as Raju's wife
- Satya Krishnan as SI's wife
- Sonia Chowdary as Sita

== Soundtrack ==
Anukoni Prayanam

Soundtrack album by S Siva Dinavahi
- Released: 2022
- Recorded: 2022
- Genre: Feature film soundtrack
- Length: 13:41
- Language: Telugu
- Label: Aditya Music
- Producer: S Siva Dinavahi

The music was composed by S Siva Dinavahi. ADITYA Music Company released the music.

No.	Title	Lyrics	Singer(s)	Length
1.	"Ye Kadhanu Ye Kanchiki"	Madhukiran Maddikunta	Shankar Mahadevan	3:39
2.	"The Soul Of Anukoni Prayanam"	Madhukiran Maddikunta	Harini Ivaturi	3:53
3.	"Kanta Neeru"	Madhukiran Maddikunta	Parvathi	1:31
4.	"Sontha Ooru"	Rehman	Siva Dinavahi	4:38
Total length:				13:41

== Reception ==
Anukoni Prayanam received mixed reviews from critics. Deepthi Nandan from SOUTHFIRST gave a 2.5 out of five rating: "Rajendra Prasad is the pilot. Heavy drama entwined with comedy, and being old-school, appreciate its genuineness." The Times of India states it as "This well-intentioned dramedy is a lengthy commentary on life" with the same rating.
