= Narasimha Raju (Telugu actor) =

Indian (Telugu) actor

- Born: Vetukuri Narasimha Raju; Vadluru, West Godavari district, Andhra Pradesh, India
- Other name: Andhra Kamal Hasan
- Occupation: Actor
- Children: Jagadamba, a son

Narasimha Raju or Narasimharaju is a Telugu film and television actor. He rose to the heights of stardom with his movies Needaleni Adadi (1974), Thoorpu Padamara (1976), Kanya-Kumari (1977), Idekkadi Nyayam (1977), and Jaganmohini (1978). He is considered the folk hero of the generation next to the likes of N. T. Rama Rao and Kanta Rao. He is also known by the moniker Andhra Kamal Haasan.

Raju made his debut as an actor in 1974 with the film Needa Leni Aadadi. It is also the debut film for actress Prabha. The film ran for a hundred days and was commercially successful. Raju started getting offers for roles from other directors.

The film Jaganmohini (1978), directed by B. Vittalacharya, in which Raju plays the main character became a blockbuster. Later, he acted in such films as Gandharva Kanya, Mantradandam, Mohini Sapatham, all directed by Vittalacharya. He also worked with other directors as a folklore hero in films like Triloka Sundari (1980), directed by Singeetam Srinivasa Rao. Raju acted in about 100 films in two decades. He is now active in Tamil television serials.

== Personal life ==
Raju is married and has a son and a daughter. His daughter, Jagadamba, is working as HR personnel. His son is working as a Project Director in Bank of Montreal, Canada. Both of them are married, and Raju has grandchildren.

== Filmography ==
- Needa Leni Aadadi (1974)
- Ammayilu Jagratta (1975)
- Moguda Pellama (1975)
- Atyavaarillu (1976)
- Thoorpu Padamara (1976)
- Kanya-Kumari (1977)
- Rambha Urvasi Menaka (1977)
- Idekkadi Nyayam (1977) as Shankaram
- Anukunnadi Sadhista (1978)
- Jaganmohini (1978)
- Swarga Seema (1978)
- Seetapathi Samsaram (1978) as Anand
- Prayanamlo Padanisalu (1978)
- Anthuleni Vintha Katha (1979) as Vidyasagar
- Kaliyuga Mahabharatam (1979)
- Lakshmi Pooja (1979) as Ramraj
- Punadhirallu (1979)
- Gandharva Kanya (1979) as Jayasekhar
- Punnami Naagu (1980)
- Mahashakti (1980)
- Sri Vasavi Kanyaka Prameswari Mahatyam (1980)
- Triloka Sundari (1980)
- Venkateswara Vrata Mahatyam (1980) as Nagaraju aka Raja
- Amrutha Kalasam (1981)
- Minister Mahalakshmi (1981)
- Daari Tappina Manishi (1981)
- Gola Nagamma (1981)
- Simha Swapnam (1981)
- Maa Voori Pedda Manushulu (1981)
- Entaghatu Premayo (1982)
- Maro Malupu (1982)
- Jayasudha (1982)
- Amara Jeevi (1983)
- Idhi Kaadu Mugimpu (1983)...Ranga
- Kanthayya Kanakayya (1983) as Raju
- Lanke Bindelu (1983) as Polaiah
- Navamohini (1984)
- Kondaveeti Nagulu (1984) as Seshu, Nagulu's (Krishnam Raju) younger brother
- Eduruleni Monagallu (1984)
- Railu Dopidi (1984) as Arjun
- Sangeeta Samrat (1984)
- Andarikante Monagadu (1985) as Sekhar
- Apanindalu Aadavallakena? (1985)
- Danger Light (1985)
- Jai Bhetala (1985)
- Mayaml Mohini (1985)
- Patala Nagu (1985)
- Prachanda Bhairavi (1985) as Sunanda
- Vishakanya (1985) as Vikram
- Magadheerudu (1986)
- Mohini Shapatham (1986)
- Tatayya Kankanam (1986)
- Pagabattina Panchali (1987)
- Srisaila Bhramarambika Kataksham (1991)
- Puttinti Gowravam (1996)
- Bethala Mantrikudu (1997)
- Sindhooram (1997)
- Ganesh (1998)
- Bala Veerulu (1999)
- Prema Katha (1999)
- Indiramma (2003) as Prosecution Lawyer
- Kaani (2004)
- Bharati (2006)
- Jaganmohini (2009; Tamil)
- Andala Rakshasi (2012)
- Brundavanamlo Gopika (2013)
- Anukoni Prayanam (2022)

== Television series ==
Year	Title	Language	Channel
2004–2005	Santosham	Telugu	ETV
2004–2008	Chakravakam	Telugu	Gemini TV
2007–2010	Ammayi Kaapuram	Telugu	Gemini TV
2008	Sendhoorapoove	Tamil	Sun TV
2008–2009	Bommarillu	Telugu	Gemini TV
2009–2012	Gorintaku	Telugu	Gemini TV
2011–2012	Shravani Subramanyam	Telugu	Gemini TV
2014–2018	Kalyana Parisu	Tamil	Sun TV
2017	Mullum Malarum	Tamil	Zee Tamil
2017–2018	Nandini	Tamil	Sun TV
2017–2022	Sembaruthi	Tamil	Zee Tamil
2020–2022	Endrendrum Punnagai	Tamil	Zee Tamil
2021	Yaaradi Nee Mohini	Tamil	Zee Tamil
2021	Abhiyum Naanum	Tamil	Sun TV
2022	Mukkupudaka	Telugu	Zee Telugu
2023	Siragadikka Aasai	Tamil	Star Vijay
2023–2024	Geethanjali	Telugu	Gemini TV
2023–2024	Muthazhagu	Tamil	Star Vijay
2024–Present	Marumagal	Tamil	Sun TV
2025–2026	Ayali	Tamil	Zee Tamil
2026	Sandhya Ragam	Tamil	Zee Tamil
