= Ghar Mein Ram Gali Mein Shyam =

- Directed by: Subhash Sonik
- Produced by: Jairam Gulabani
- Starring: Govinda; Neelam; Khushbu Sundar
- Music by: Amar-Utpal
- Release date: 15 January 1988
- Country: India
- Language: Hindi

Ghar Mein Ram Gali Mein Shyam (transl. Ram at home, Shyam on the streets) is a 1988 Indian Hindi-language film. It is a remake of the Telugu film Intlo Ramayya Veedhilo Krishnayya.

== Plot ==
While on a trip to a village, Amar is asked to stay at the Srivastavs' residence. He meets their stubborn and headstrong daughter, Jaya, and, after a series of misunderstandings and confrontations, the two fall in love and marry. Jaya moves in with Amar at his residence in Bombay, where she meets their neighbours, Mr Dharamchand and his wife. Amar begins to suspect Jaya of having an affair with Dharamchand. When confronted, Dharamchand vehemently denies this, but then deviously devises a scheme to separate the newly married couple.

== Cast ==
- Govinda as Amar
- Neelam as Jaya Srivastav
- Anupam Kher as Dharamchand
- Johnny Lever as Srivastav's servant
- Satish Shah as Mr. Srivastav
- Rita Bhaduri as Mrs. Dharamchand
- Khushbu Sundar as Munni

== Music ==
Music composed by Amar-Utpal

Song	Singer
"Ghar Mein Ram, Gali Mein Shyam"	Kishore Kumar
"Tujhko Di Surat Pari Si"	Pankaj Udhas
"Yeh Jeevan Aisa Hai"	Pankaj Udhas
"Ganpati Bappa Morya"	Suresh Wadkar
"Duhayi Hai Duhayi, Dil Kaisi Chot Khayi"	Mohammed Aziz, Anuradha Paudwal
