= Major Chandrakanth (1966 film) =

1966 film by K. Balachander

- Theatrical release poster
- Directed by: K. Balachander
- Written by: K. Balachander
- Based on: Major Chandrakanth by K. Balachander
- Produced by: A. V. Meiyappan
- Starring: Major Sundarrajan; Nagesh; R. Muthuraman; A. V. M. Rajan; Jayalalithaa
- Cinematography: S. Maruti Rao
- Edited by: R. G. Gopu
- Music by: V. Kumar
- Production company: AVM Productions
- Release date: 11 November 1966
- Running time: 163 minutes
- Country: India
- Language: Tamil

Major Chandrakanth is a 1966 Indian Tamil-language drama film written and directed by K. Balachander. Based on his play of the same name, the film stars Major Sundarrajan, Nagesh, R. Muthuraman, A. V. M. Rajan and Jayalalithaa. Produced by A. V. Meiyappan of AVM Productions, it revolves around a retired and blind major who gives asylum to a fugitive wanted for committing murder, unaware that the victim was his younger son.

Major Chandrakanth was released on 11 November 1966, during Diwali. It became a commercial success and won two Chennai Film Fans' Association Awards: Best Film, and Best Supporting Actor (Muthuraman). Sundarrajan, who portrayed the title role in both the play and film, later became popularly known with the prefix "Major".

== Plot ==
Mohan is a tailor who lives with his younger sister Vimala. Orphaned at an early age, Mohan goes through a life of hardship and fulfills all his sister's wishes. Rajinikanth, a promiscuous man, lures Vimala and cheats on her. Unable to face her brother, she commits suicide. Mohan confronts Rajinikanth and kills him in revenge. Now a fugitive, Mohan hides in the house of Chandrakanth, a retired and blind major.

Mohan is amused and fascinated by Chandrakanth's virtues and how he manages to live though he is blind. Mohan reveals why he is obsconding from the law, and the deceased happens to be Chandrakanth's younger son. Chandrakanth feels humiliated for nurturing Rajinikanth and is sorry for Mohan's plight. Ultimately, Chandrakanth's elder son Srikanth, a police inspector, arrests Mohan and his own father for showing hospitality to a criminal.

== Cast ==
- Major Sundarrajan as Major Chandrakanth
- Nagesh as Mohan
- R. Muthuraman as Srikanth
- A. V. M. Rajan as Rajinikanth
- Jayalalithaa as Vimala

== Production ==
In October 1963, it was announced that K. Balachander had sold the film rights of his play Major Chandrakanth; the film adaptation would be directed by P. Madhavan for Nithyakalyani Films, and star Sivaji Ganesan, but was later shelved. Instead, the play was adapted into a Hindi film Oonche Log in 1965, with a different cast and crew. A. V. Meiyappan later decided to produce a Tamil film adaptation of the play under his banner AVM Productions with the same title, and Balachander was chosen as director, as it was Meiyappan's long-time desire that Balachander make a film for AVM.

Sundarrajan, who portrayed the blind major Chandrakanth in the Tamil play, reprised his role in this film. The character's sons Srikanth and Rajinikanth were played by R. Muthuraman and A. V. M. Rajan respectively, replacing Venky and Govindarajan. Jayalalithaa was cast as Vimala, unlike the play where the same character was unseen. The film was the only collaboration between her and Balachander. Nagesh was cast as Vimala's brother Mohan, replacing Gokulnath. The role was a departure from the comedic roles he was then generally known for. Cinematography was handled by S. Maruti Rao, the art direction by A. K. Sekhar, and the editing by R. G. Gopu. Meiyappan's sons Murugan, Kumaran and Saravanan were assistant producers. The final length measured 4,425 metres (14,518 ft).

== Soundtrack ==
The music was composed by V. Kumar. The song "Kalyana Sapadu Podava" is set in Sindhu Bhairavi, a Carnatic raga. The song "Oru Naal Yaaro", picturised on Mohan going to prove to the audience in his neighbourhood that his Vimala is singing on the radio, became a chartbuster.

Track listing
No.	Title	Lyrics	Singer(s)	Length
1.	"Naane Pani Nilavu"	Vaali	P. Susheela	4:06
2.	"Oru Naal Yaaro"	Vaali	P. Susheela	3:35
3.	"Netrunee Chinnapappa"	Vaali	T. M. Soundararajan, P. Susheela	4:01
4.	"Kalyana Sapadu Podava"	Vaali	T. M. Soundararajan	4:12
5.	"Kalyana Sapadu Podava" (Pathos)	Vaali	T. M. Soundararajan	1:35
6.	"Thuninthunil"	Suratha	Sirkazhi Govindarajan	1:25
Total length:				18:54

== Release and reception ==
Major Chandrakanth was released on 11 November 1966, during Diwali. In a review dated 26 November 1966, The Indian Express said Sundarrajan brought not only "complete conviction and dignity" to his role but also "revels his rare characterisational depth and sensitivity." The reviewer also praised the performances of Nagesh, Jayalalithaa, Muthuraman and Rajan, the photography and the editing. A critic from Kalki praised the performances of the cast, particularly Sundarrajan, but felt the film looked like a play in many places. The film won two Chennai Film Fans' Association Awards: Best Film, and Best Supporting Actor (Muthuraman).

== Legacy ==
Following the film's commercial success, Sundarrajan became popularly known with the prefix "Major". During the making of Apoorva Raagangal (1975), Balachander rechristened newcomer Shivaji Rao Gaekwad as Rajinikanth, named after A. V. M. Rajan's character, and Rajinikanth went on to become one of the most successful stars of Tamil cinema.

== Bibliography ==
- Rajadhyaksha, Ashish; Willemen, Paul (1998) [1994]. Encyclopaedia of Indian Cinema. British Film Institute and Oxford University Press. ISBN 0-19-563579-5.
- Saravanan, M. (2013) [2005]. AVM 60 Cinema (3rd ed.). Rajarajan Pathippagam. OCLC 1158347612.
