= Major Chandrakanth (play) =

- Original language: Tamil
- Written by: K. Balachander
- Genre: Drama

Premiere
- Date: 1963

Major Chandrakanth is a Tamil-language play written by K. Balachander and staged in the 1960s. It was adapted into a Hindi film titled Oonche Log in 1965, a Tamil namesake film in 1966, a Telugu film titled Sukha Dukhalu in 1968, a Malayalam film titled Karthavyam in 1982, and a Kannada film titled Karune Illada Kanoonu in 1983.

== Plot ==
Chandrakanth, a morally upright blind major, gives asylum to a man who is a fugitive, having committed murder. The murdered man was Rajinikanth, the lover of the fugitive's sister; he had cheated her on promise of marriage, leading her to commit suicide since she was unable to bear the shame. Chandrakanth's elder son Srikanth, a police officer, is tasked with finding the murderer. It is later revealed that Rajinikanth was Chandrakanth's younger son, and that both Chandrakanth and the fugitive were unaware of each other's identity the whole time. Srikanth arrests the fugitive and his father for having given shelter to a criminal.

== Cast ==
- Sundarrajan as Chandrakanth
- Venky as Srikanth
- Gokulnath as the fugitive
- P. R. Govindarajan as Rajinikanth

== Production ==
When working in the Accountant general's office in Madras (now Chennai), K. Balachander wrote and starred as a blind major in a play titled Courage of Conviction. Since the new Accountant general was a Bengali, Balachander decided the play had to be in English so that the Accountant general would understand it. This was unlike his other plays, which were written in Tamil. He later decided to expand the play into a full-length script for his friend P. R. Govindarajan's troupe Ragini Recreations, this time in Tamil and with the title Major Chandrakanth due to the limited scope for English plays in Madras. In the Tamil play, Sundarrajan portrayed Chandrakanth (he would later be known as Major Sundarrajan for this portrayal) and Venky portrayed his elder son Srikanth (he would later be known as Srikanth for this portrayal).

== Reception ==
The play was first staged in 1963. It received critical acclaim, and was staged over a hundred times.

== Adaptations ==
Major Chandrakanth was adapted into a Hindi film titled Oonche Log in 1965, a Tamil namesake film in 1966, a Telugu film titled Sukha Dukhalu in 1968, a Malayalam film titled Karthavyam in 1982, and a Kannada film titled Karune Illada Kanoonu in 1983.

== Bibliography ==
- Rajadhyaksha, Ashish; Willemen, Paul (1998) [1994]. Encyclopaedia of Indian Cinema. British Film Institute and Oxford University Press. ISBN 0-19-563579-5.
