= Sakhinetipalle mandal =

- Mandal
- Interactive Map Outlining mandal
- Location in Andhra Pradesh, India Sakhinetipalle mandal (India)
- Coordinates: 16.4117°N 81.7448°E
- Country: India
- State: Andhra Pradesh
- District: Dr. B. R. Ambedkar Konaseema
- Headquarters: Sakhinetipalle

Area
  - Total: 99.52 km^{2} (38.42 sq mi)

Population (2011)
  - Total: 72,560
  - Density: 729.1/km^{2} (1,888/sq mi)

Languages
  - Official: Telugu
- Time zone: UTC+5:30 (IST)

Sakhinetipalle mandal is one of the 22 mandals in Dr. B. R. Ambedkar Konaseema district of Andhra Pradesh. It is under the administration of Amalapuram revenue division and the headquarters are located at Sakhinetipalle village.

== Demographics ==
According to 2011 census of India, in Sakhinetipalle mandal, there are a total of 19,214 households. The population stands at 72,560, with 36,403 males and 36,157 females. Scheduled Castes comprise 21,849 individuals, with 10,873 males and 10,976 females, while Scheduled Tribes number 411, with 195 males and 216 females. The literate population is 54,311, with 28,738 males and 25,573 females. There are 31,450 workers, including 22,562 males and 8,888 females, and 41,110 non-workers, consisting of 13,841 males and 27,269 females.

== Towns and villages ==
As of 2011 census, the mandal has 8 villages. The settlements in the mandal are listed below:

1. Antarvedi
2. Antarvedipalem
3. Appanaramuni Lanka
4. Gudimula Kandrika
5. Kesavadasupalem
6. Mori
7. Rameswaram
8. Sakhinetipalle
