= Kotipalli =

- Village
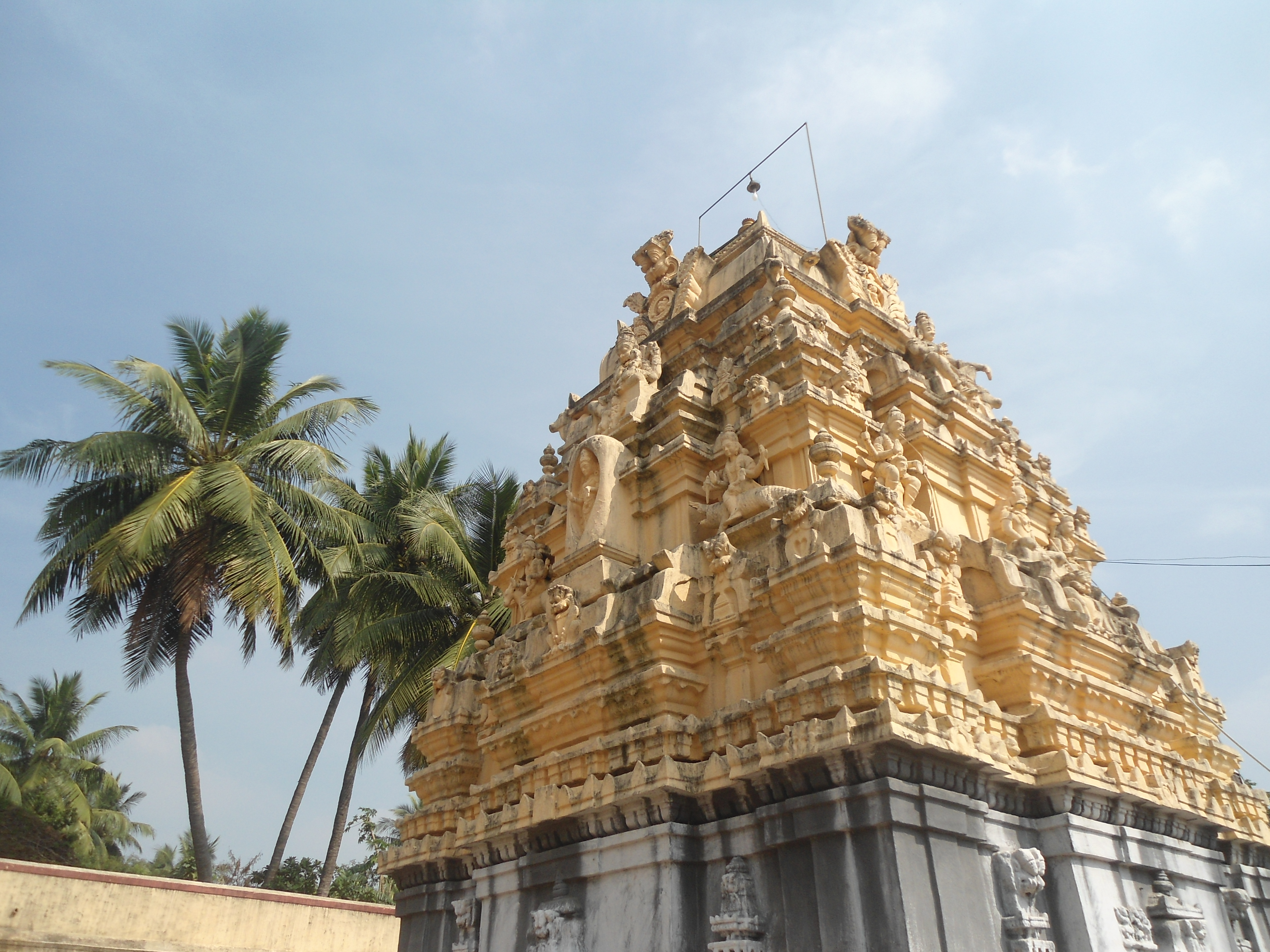
- Kotipalli Shiva Temple
- Interactive map of Kotipalli
- Location in Andhra Pradesh, India
- Coordinates: 16.7014°N 82.0394°E
- Country: India
- State: Andhra Pradesh
- District: Konaseema district

Languages
  - Official: Telugu
- Time zone: UTC+5:30 (IST)
- Vehicle registration: AP

Kotipalli also known as Koti Theertham is a village in K. Gangavaram mandal of Ramachandrapuram revenue division in Konaseema district, Andhra Pradesh, India. The temple town is also known as Kumararama of the Pancharama Kshetras, and is located 15 km from Amalapuram..

Historically Kotipalli has been a site of Hindu learning and philosophy. One of the Acharya's of Dwaadasaradhyas from the Srouta Saiva Siddhanta philosophy, Kotipalli Viswaaradhya (Kashyapa Gotram) was born to Someswara and Bhavani in 12th century AD at Kotipalli. He authored such great books as Chaturvedasaram, Vrushabhadhipa Satakam and Basavarajeeyam and propagated Saiva Dharmas. He is also stated to have stayed at Pamidimukkala and then in Palkurki village and hence known as Palakurti Viswaradhya.

Kotipalli is one of the three important ferry points for Kotipalli-Mukteswaram and the other two being Bodasakurru-Pasarlapudi and Sakhinetipalli-Narasapuram in the Konaseema region.
