= Antarvedi =

Village in Andhra Pradesh

- village
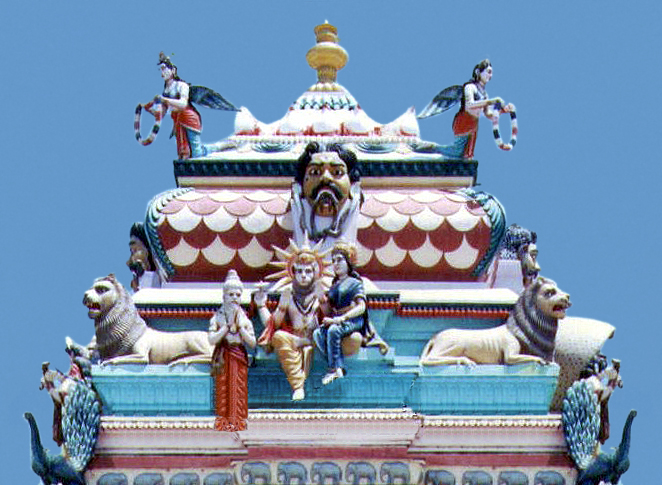
- Antarvedi temple on the banks of Godavari
- Interactive map of Antarvedi
- Location in Andhra Pradesh, India Antarvedi (India)
- Coordinates: 16.3333°N 81.7333°E
- Country: India
- State: Andhra Pradesh
- District: Konaseema
- Elevation: 0 m (0 ft)

Population (2011)
  - Total: 15,605

Languages
  - Official: Telugu
- Time zone: UTC+5:30 (IST)
- Nearest city: Palakollu

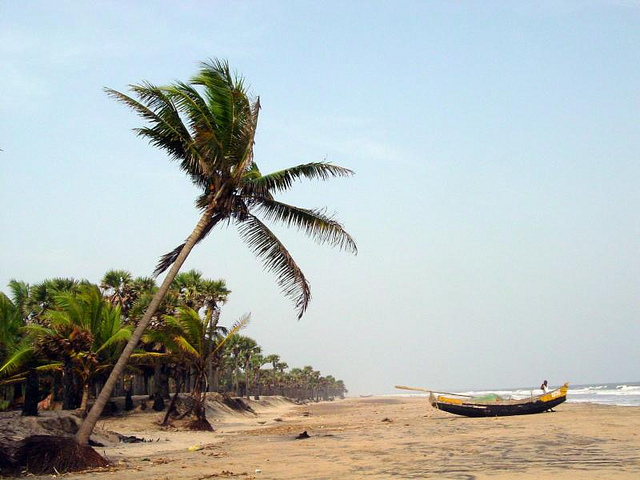
Antarvedi Beach view

Antarvedi is a village in the Sakhinetipalle mandal, located in the Dr. B. R. Ambedkar Konaseema district of the Andhra Pradesh state in India. The village is situated at the place where the Bay of Bengal and Vashista Godavari, a distributary of the Godavari River, meet. Antarvedi was named in honour of the Lord as "Narasimhakshetra".

== History ==
శిలా శాసనము నవదళోత్పల మాలిక శ్రీయుతుడైనా శ్రీ కొప్పనాతి అది నారాయణ అంతర్వేది క్షేత్ర స్వామియైన శ్రీ లక్ష్మీ నరసింహ స్వామి వారి ఆలయము, ప్రాకార విమాన మండపాదులు కొన్ని కట్టించి ,భగవదర్పణ బుద్దితో, తానారంభించిన నిర్మాణ కార్యమును సాంగముగావింపవలసినదిగా ,కుమారులకు జెప్పినతనే ,తోడైన రంగనాధునితో గుడి,ధీమంతుడైన కృష్ణమ్మ దివ్యమై ,భవ్యమైన మహామహిమ యొప్పనట్లుగా శాలి వాహన శక సంవత్సరములు [1745] క్రీ .శ 1823, జరిగిన పిదప, స్వభాను నామ సంవత్సరాధిక చైత్ర కృష్ణ దశమి భాను వానరము నాటికీ పూర్తి చేయించి నిష్కళంకమైన భక్తి గల్గిన సజ్జనులు ఔనని మెచ్చుకొనునట్లుగా, ధన్యమైన చితము గలవాడై సమర్పించెను

The stone inscription belongs to Navada Lothpala Malika

Sri Koppanathi is the temple of Lord Narayana Narasimha Swami. Construction of some of the ramparts of Vimana Mandapadas, along with the temple featuring Ranganadhu and Krishna, was completed on Shali Vahana Saka Years [1745] 1823 AD, Pidapa, Swabhanu nama samvatsara dhika Chaitra Krishna Dashami Bhanu Vanara.

Inscription of Navada Lothpala Malika

This stone inscription pertains to Navada Lothpala Malika. The temple of Sri Koppanathi Adhi Narayana is dedicated to Lord Lakshmi Narasimha Swami of Antharvedi. He was instrumental in constructing some of the ramparts of the Vimana Mandapadas. With a heart devoted to Bhagavadarpana, he prayed for his sons, honoring the temple associated with Ranganadhudu. Shree Koppanathi Krishnamma, son of Koppanathi Adhi Narayana, is acknowledged as divine and glorious. This temple was constructed in the Shali Vahana Saka, corresponding to the year 1745, or 1823 AD.

The inscription notes that the work was completed on the day of Chaitra Krishna Dashami in the Swabhanu year, referred to as Bhanu Vanara. A blessed image was presented on this occasion, reflecting the appreciation of those who have perfected their devotion.

Koppanathi Krishnamma, a revered king from the Pallava dynasty and belonging to the Agni Kula Kshatriya community, is remembered for his monumental contributions to the Antarvedi temple. He was deeply devoted to Lord Lakshmi Narasimha Swamy and is credited with building the famous temple at the confluence of the Bay of Bengal and the Vashishta Godavari River in the year of 1823 (Shalivahana saka 1745) .As a devout ruler, Koppanathi Krishnamma donated thousands of acres of land, along with vast amounts of diamonds and gold, to the temple. His generosity ensured the temple's prosperity and allowed it to become a major pilgrimage site. His contributions are commemorated in an inscription located near the wall of the Lakshmi Narasimha Swamy idol inside the temple, marking his significant role in the temple's development.Hailing from the prestigious Pallava dynasty, known for its support of religion, culture, and the arts, Krishnamma's lineage as an Agni Kula Kshatriya further highlights his commitment to upholding his spiritual and royal duties. His legacy lives on through the grandeur of the Antarvedi temple, and he is revered for his unwavering devotion and generosity.

== Description ==
Antarvedi, in terms of geographical surface area, covers about 4 square miles (6.4 km). The village contains the widely revered Lord Sri Lakshminarasimha Swamy temple, located opposite Vasishta Godavari. A launch pad allows visitors to land on the small island at the other side of the Godavari River - from this point, travel can then be undertaken to the convergence point of the river and the ocean.

== Geography ==
Antarvedi is located at 16.3333°N 81.7333°E, and is close to being at sea level. According to Kopanathi Krishnamma Varma, layout of the temple complex has great significance with the geometry of the delta itself and more to be studied in terms of current and force of the confluence at the location.

== See also ==
- Sri Lakshmi Narasimha Swamy Temple, Antarvedi
