= Mukteswaram =

- village
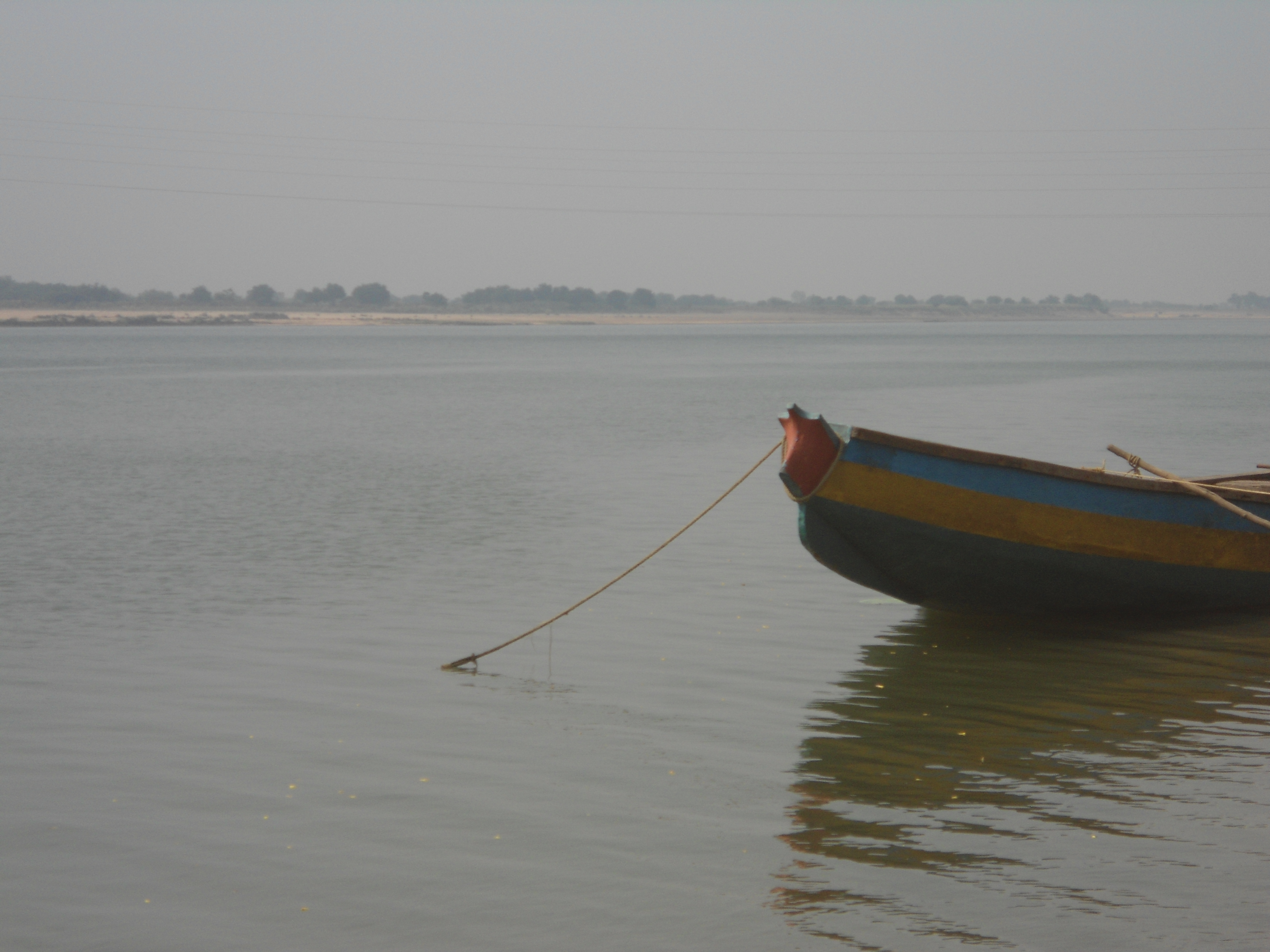
- River Godavari at Mukteswaram
- Interactive map of Mukteswaram
- Country: India
- State: Andhra Pradesh
- District: Konaseema

Government
  - Type: Democratic
  - Body: Government of Andhra Pradesh

Languages
  - Official: Telugu
- Time zone: UTC+5:30 (IST)
- PIN: 533211
- Telephone code: 8856
- Vehicle registration: AP 5 / AP 39
- Nearest city: Kakinada
- Lok Sabha constituency: Amalapuram
- Vidhan Sabha constituency: Amalapuram
- Civic agency: Ainivilli Village Panchayat
- Website: konaseema.ap.gov.in

Mukteswaram is a village located in Ainavilli Mandal, Konaseema Delta, Amalapuram revenue division in Dr B R Ambedkar Konaseema district of Andhra Pradesh, India. It is situated near the River Gautami-Godavari, a tributary to the Godavari. Mukteswaram is one of the three important Ferry points for Kotipalli-Mukteswaram and the other two being; Bodasakurru-Pasarlapudi and Sakhinetipalli-Narasapuram in the Konaseema region. Mukteswaram is 60 km from Kakinada.
