= Konetampet =

- Village
- Location in Tamil Nadu, India
- Coordinates: 13.334°N 79.466°E
- Country: India
- State: Tamil Nadu
- District: Tiruvallur

Languages
  - Official: Tamil, Telugu
- Time zone: UTC+5:30 (IST)
- PIN: 631207
- Area code: (91)44 - 2784
- Vehicle registration: TN-20
- Lok Sabha constituency: Arakkonam
- Assembly constituency: Thiruttani

Konetampet is a village in Tiruvallur District of the Indian state of Tamil Nadu. It is known for its fertile agricultural lands and the west-to-east flowing river Kusasthalai. It has produced many personalities who have made a mark in the film industry, medical professions, information technology, entrepreneurship, trading and politics.

== Geography ==
Konetampet is located at 13.334°N 79.466°E.

== Transportation ==
The nearest railway station is at Ekambarakuppam. The nearest airport is Tirupati.
