= Sukha Dukhalu =

1968 film by I. N. Murthy

- Theatrical release poster
- Directed by: I. N. Murthy
- Screenplay by: Palagummi Padmaraju
- Based on: Major Chandrakanth by K. Balachander
- Produced by: P. Ekamreswara Rao; N. N. Bhatt
- Starring: Jayalalitha; Vanisri; Rama Krishna; Chandra Mohan
- Cinematography: M. Kannappa
- Music by: S. P. Kodandapani
- Production company: Sri Vijayabhat Movies
- Release date: 4 January 1968
- Country: India
- Language: Telugu

Sukha Dukhalu (transl. Joys and Sorrows) is a 1968 Indian Telugu-language drama film directed by I. N. Murthy. The film features Vanisri, Jayalalitha, Ramkrishna and Chandra Mohan in lead roles, with S. V. Ranga Rao and Haranath in supporting roles. It is an adaptation of the Tamil play Major Chandrakanth by K. Balachander.

Released on 4 January 1968, the film was a commercial success. Its soundtrack includes the popular songs "Idi Mallela Velayani" and "Medante Meda Kadu," the latter marking one of the early hits of S. P. Balasubrahmanyam in Telugu cinema.

== Plot ==
Major Chandrakanth (S.V. Ranga Rao) is a retired army major who lost his eyesight on the battlefield years ago. Despite being blind, he is strict and enforces discipline on everyone in the house. He is very adept at moving and uses his other senses to locate objects and compensate his lost eyesight. He is disciplined such that when someone makes a mistake, he punishes them by hitting them with a stick. He lives with his two sons, Inspector Srikanth aka Sri (Ramakrishna) and Ravikanth aka Ravi (Haranath). Chandrakanth has a niece, Bala Tripura Sundari aka Bala (Jayalalitha) who loves Srikanth and vice versa.

Ravi studies outside the city in a college and has a playboy nature. He traps a fellow student, Rajini (Vanisri) who is the best singer in the college. Rajini has a brother Mohan (Chandra Mohan) who dotes on her and values her more than anything. While on a college excursion, Ravi and Rajini consummate. Ravi promises her that he will marry her with the blessings of his father and family. Ravi returns home, while Rajini is disheartened to find that she is pregnant and is afraid to tell her brother. She writes a letter to Ravi asking him to return so she can marry him and take the blessings of her brother. Srikanth reads the letter and realizes what Ravi has done. When Ravi indicates he will get an abortion done, Srikanth reprimands him and tells him to marry Rajini. They both keep the letter and predicament a secret from their father.

One day, Chandrakanth receives a message from Rajini over the phone. He asks for the letter Rajini wrote to Ravi and for it to be read out loud, but Srikanth snatches the letter and intentionally misreads it to avoid distress to the family. Chandrakanth keeps the letter in his drawer. Following, Ravi also steals money from Chandrakanth's bag, for which Srikanth takes the blame upon himself. Bala eventually learns about Ravi as well and that Srikanth is protecting him from blame.

Meanwhile, unaware of Rajini's pregnancy, Mohan makes arrangements for her marriage. She commits suicide out of disgrace, leaving a note and Mohan heartbroken. Rajini's death news comes in the newspaper and Srikanth once again hides the truth from Chandrakanth. Mohan learns that Ravi is the reason for Rajini's death and hunts him down. One day, he comes across Ravi on a beach and confronts him. Ravi claims he has no involvement and insults Rajini, and they get into a fight, in which Mohan accidentally kills him. Shocked and afraid, a shocked Mohan flees and incidentally lands at Chandrakanth's house. He intrudes into the house when no one is there except Chandrakanth, and Chandrakanth feeds him and shelters him out of sympathy. They do not know each other and spend their time learning about one another, where Mohan learns that Chandrakanth is blind. Chandrakanth listens to Mohan's story of his sister's death and the accidental murder, and Chandrakanth empathizes.

The next day, Chandrakanth receives a letter about Ravi's death. Mohan reads it and Chandrakanth is shocked. Mohan suspects the man he killed may be Chandrakanth's son, which he later verifies after Chandrakanth shows him a photo of Ravi. Chandrakanth also pulls the letter Rajini wrote and asks Mohan to read it. Chandrakanth realizes Srikanth lied about the entire situation including misreading the letter. The two are dejected and exchange sympathy. Chandrakanth suggests Mohan to take shelter elsewhere as his son is a police officer. Meanwhile, a disheartened Srikanth enters and relays Ravi's death news to his father, but realizes he is already aware of it. Mohan exposes himself to Srikanth as the murderer and Srikanth attempts to arrest him, when Chandrakanth interferes and pleads Srikanth to allow Mohan one day to spend at the house as he made a promise. Srikanth says that, according to law, he will have to arrest Chandrakanth as well for sheltering a criminal. Before being arrested, Chandrakanth asks Srikanth to leave the uniform so he can solve a personal matter. He hits Srikanth with the stick for cheating him by misreading the letter and blaming himself for Ravi's theft. Mohan, unwilling to let Chandrakanth be arrested, takes Srikanth's gun and threatens him before shooting himself. Before breathing his last, he asks them to play his sister's song on the radio.

== Cast ==
- S. V. Ranga Rao as Major Chandrakanth
- Rama Krishna as Inspector Srikanth aka Sri
- Haranath as Ravikanth aka Ravi
- Jayalalithaa as Bala Tripura Sundari aka Bala
- Chandra Mohan as Mohan
- Vanisri as Rajini
- Ramana Reddy as Bala's father
- Suryakantham as Bala's mother
- Saradhi
- Maddali
- B Koteswara Rao

== Production ==
Sukhadukhalu is the Telugu adaptation of the Tamil play Major Chandrakanth, written by K. Balachander. The play had previously been adapted into the Tamil film Major Chandrakanth (1966), directed by Balachander himself. For the Telugu version, the play was translated by Palagummi Padmaraju, who made significant modifications to align it with Telugu culture and sensibilities. Producer P. Ekamreswara Rao, after witnessing the play, decided to adapt it into a feature film. Vanisri played the role previously portrayed by Jayalalitha in the Tamil film, while Jayalalitha was cast in a different role for the Telugu version.

== Soundtrack ==
The music was composed by S. P. Kodandapani. The songs "Idi Mallela Velayani" and "Medante Meda Kadu" are famous songs till date. The latter was one of the first notable hits of S. P. Balasubrahmanyam in Telugu cinema.

Track list
No.	Title	Lyrics	Singer(s)	Length
1.	"Idi Mallela Velayani"	Devulapalli Krishnasastri	P. Suseela
2.	"Medante Meda Kadu"	Devulapalli Krishnasastri	S. P. Balasubrahmanyam
3.	"O Andalu Chinde Aa Kallalone"	C. Narayana Reddy	S. P. Balasubrahmanyam, P. Suseela
4.	"Endaru Unnaru Meelo Endaru Unnaru"	Kosaraju	P. Suseela, Ghantasala
5.	"O Padaaru Naa Vayasu"	Aarudra	S. P. Balasubrahmanyam, P. Suseela

== Reception ==
The film was successful at the box-office.
