= Oonche Log (1965 film) =

1965 film by Phani Majumdar

- Poster
- Directed by: Phani Majumdar
- Screenplay by: Phani Majumdar
- Based on: Major Chandrakanth by K. Balachander
- Produced by: Sathyam-Nanjundan
- Starring: Ashok Kumar; Raaj Kumar; Feroz Khan
- Cinematography: Kamal Ghosh
- Edited by: M. V. Rajan
- Music by: Chitragupta
- Production company: Chitrakala Studio
- Release date: 10 September 1965
- Running time: 138 minutes
- Country: India
- Language: Hindi

Oonche Log (transl. Exalted people) is a 1965 Indian Hindi-language drama film directed by Phani Majumdar. It is based on the play Major Chandrakanth, by K. Balachander. The film stars Ashok Kumar, Raaj Kumar, Feroz Khan in lead roles. Its lyrics were composed by Majrooh Sultanpuri and the music was given by Chitragupta.

The film was shot at Vauhini Studios, Chennai and was also noted as the first big hit of newcomer Feroz Khan, who was noted for his sensitive performance against veterans such as Ashok Kumar and Raaj Kumar. At the 13th National Film Awards it won the award for Second Best Feature Film in Hindi.

== Plot ==
Major Chandrakant (Ashok Kumar), who has become blind during warfare, has two sons, Inspector Shreekant (Raaj Kumar) and Rajnikant (Feroz Khan). Major Chandrakant promises his neighbour Master Gunichand (Kanhaiyalal) that he will get his daughter Pallavi married to Rajnikant, but Rajnikant falls in love with Vimla (K. R. Vijaya) during cadet training in Madras. When Vimla gets pregnant, he is not ready to accept her, due to fear of telling the truth to his father. Rajnikant asks Vimla to abort the child and returns to Madras.

Vimla commits suicide. Her brother Mohan (Tarun Bose) vows to avenge her death and kills Rajnikant in the train. On the run from the police, Mohan takes refuge in Major Chandrakant's house and confesses that he is a professor who has, in a fit of rage, killed the man who deceived his sister.

The Major asks Mohan to stay in the attic and makes all efforts to keep him away from his elder son who is a police inspector. When the major receives a telegram about Rajnikant's death, he realizes that Mohan is his son's murderer. He is ashamed that his son had done such a misdeed. Inspector Shreekant, on finding out the truth, arrests Mohan for committing the murder and the major for abetting a killer.

== Cast ==
- Ashok Kumar as Major Chandrakant
- Raaj Kumar as Inspector Shreekant
- Feroz Khan as Rajnikant
- K. R. Vijaya as Vimla
- Kanhaiyalal as Master Gunichand
- Tarun Bose as Mohan

== Soundtrack ==
The film's music was created by Chitragupta with lyrics written by Majrooh Sultanpuri.

Song	Singer
"Jaag Dil-E-Deewana"	Mohammed Rafi
"Tere Chanchal Nainwa"	Lata Mangeshkar
"Aaja Re Mere Pyar Ki Rahi, Raah Niharoon"	Lata Mangeshkar, Mahendra Kapoor
"Kaisi Tune Reet Rachi Bhagwaan"	Asha Bhosle, Manna Dey
