= S. P. Balasubrahmanyam =

Indian playback singer (1946–2020)

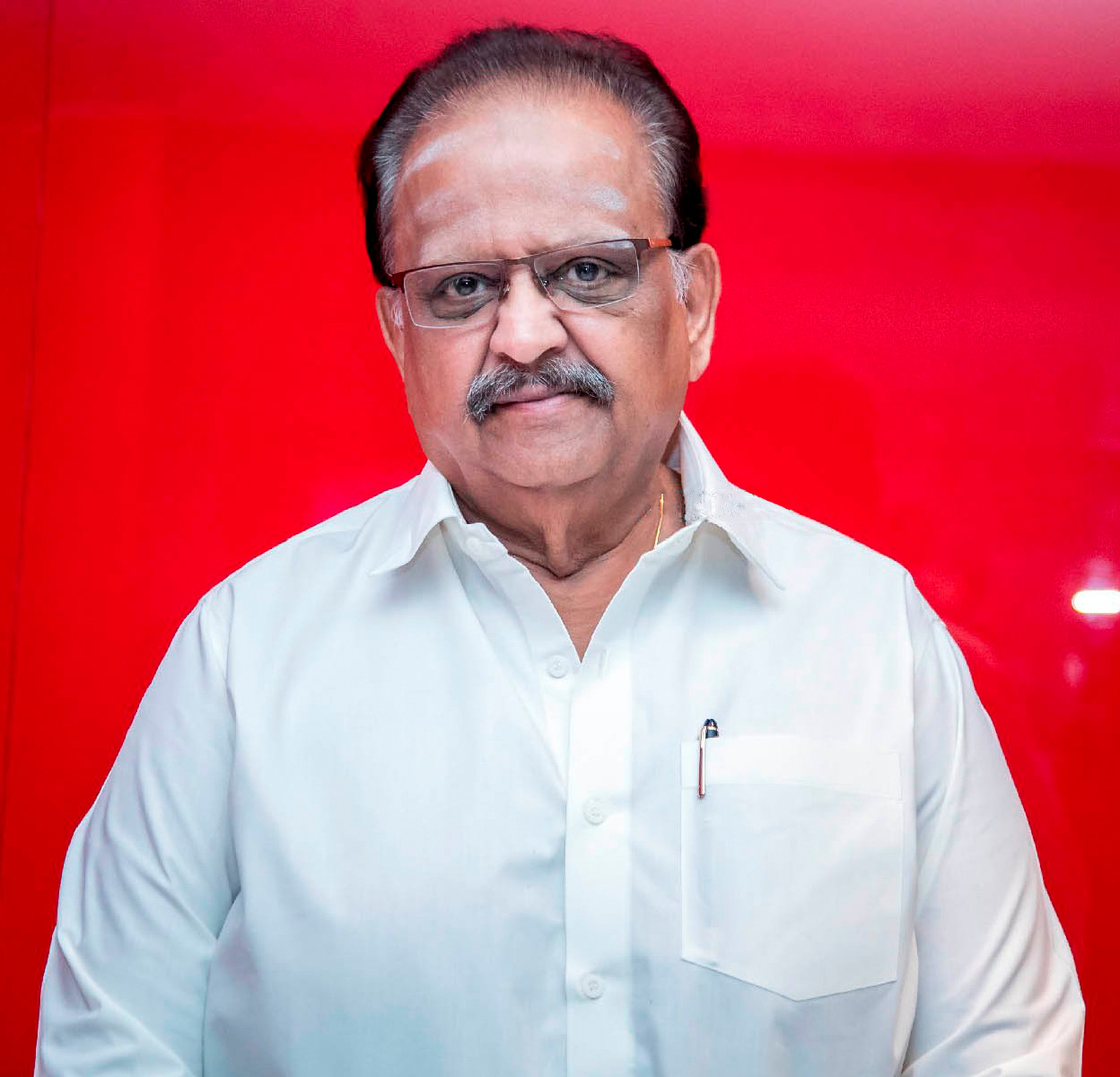
- Balasubrahmanyam at the Gurkha Audio Launch

Background information
- Also known as: SPB, Gaana Gandharva, Paadum Nila
- Born: Sripathi Panditaradhyula Balasubrahmanyam; 4 June 1946; Nellore, SPSR Nellore district, Andhra Pradesh, India
- Died: 25 September 2020 (aged 74) Chennai, Tamil Nadu, India
- Genre: Playback
- Occupations: Singer; actor; music director; voice actor; producer
- Years active: 1966–2020
- Honours: Padma Vibhushan (2021) (posthumously); Padma Bhushan (2011); Padma Shri (2001)

Sripathi Panditaradhyula Balasubrahmanyam (4 June 1946 – 25 September 2020), commonly known as SPB or Balu, was an Indian playback singer, television presenter, actor, music composer, dubbing artist, and film producer. He was widely regarded as one of the greatest Indian singers of all time. He worked in Telugu, Tamil, Kannada, Malayalam, and Hindi films and sang in a total of 16 languages.

Balasubrahmanyam was born into a Telugu family with a strong musical background in Nellore, Madras Province, British India (present-day Konetammapetta, chittoor district, Andhra Pradesh, India), now it is between Thiruvallur district and chittoor district. Despite initially pursuing engineering, his passion for music led him to a successful career in playback singing, starting with his debut in the Telugu film Sri Sri Sri Maryada Ramanna in 1966, whose music was composed by his mentor, S. P. Kodandapani. Over his career, he received six National Film Awards for Best Male Playback Singer for his performances in Telugu, Tamil, Kannada, and Hindi, along with 25 Andhra Pradesh state Nandi Awards for his work in Telugu cinema. Additionally, he was honoured various state awards from Karnataka and Tamil Nadu governments, five Filmfare Awards South and a Filmfare Award. According to some sources, he held the Guinness World Record for recording the highest number of songs by a singer with over 50,000 songs in 16 languages. On 8 February 1981, he set a record by recording 28 songs in Kannada in a single day, along with 19 songs in Tamil and 16 in Hindi, which has also been called a record.

In recognition of his contributions, Balasubrahmanyam received the NTR National Award from the Government of Andhra Pradesh in 2012, the Harivarasanam Award from the Government of Kerala in 2015, and was named the Indian Film Personality of the Year at the 47th International Film Festival of India in 2016. The Government of India honored him with the Padma Shri in 2001, the Padma Bhushan in 2011, and the Padma Vibhushan posthumously in 2021. He died on 25 September 2020 in Chennai due to post-complications from COVID-19.

S.P Balasubrahmanyam's bronze statue was unveiled by Telangana IT Minister D.Sridhar Babu along with former vice-president of India M.Venkaiah Naidu at Ravindra Bharathi, Hyderabad on 15 December 2025.

== Early life and background ==
Sripathi Panditaradhyula Balasubrahmanyam was born in Konetammapeta in Nellore district of Andhra Pradesh into a Telugu Brahmin family. His father, S. P. Sambamurthy, was a Harikatha artist who also acted in plays. His mother was Sakunthalamma, who died on 4 February 2019. He had two brothers and five sisters, including singer S. P. Sailaja. His son S. P. Charan is also a popular South Indian singer, actor and producer.

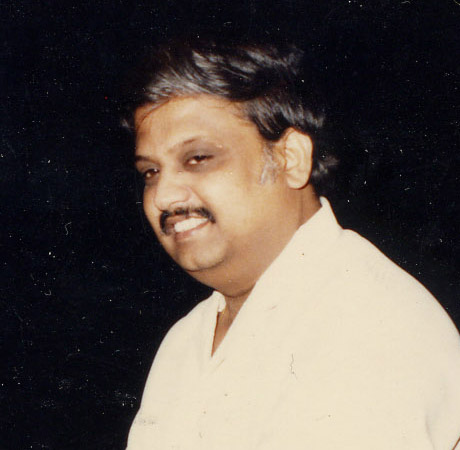
Balasubrahmanyam in 1986

Balasubrahmanyam developed an interest in music at an early age, studied musical notations and learned music on his own. He enrolled at the JNTU College of Engineering Anantapur with the intention of becoming an engineer. He said that at the time his only dream was to fulfil his father's ambition and become an engineer and get a government job.

Balasubrahmanyam continued to pursue music during his engineering studies and won awards at singing competitions. He discontinued his studies early due to typhoid and joined as an associate member of the Institution of Engineers, Chennai. In 1964, he won the first prize in a music competition for amateur singers organized by the Madras-based Telugu Cultural Organization.

He was the leader of a light music troupe composed of Anirutta (on the harmonium), Ilaiyaraaja (on guitar and later on harmonium), Baskar (on percussion) and Gangai Amaran (on guitar). He was selected as the best singer in a singing competition which was judged by S. P. Kodandapani and Ghantasala. Often visiting music composers seeking opportunities, his first audition song was "Nilave Ennidam Nerungadhe". It was rendered by veteran playback singer P. B. Sreenivas, who used to write and give him multi-lingual verses in Telugu, Tamil, Hindi, Kannada, Malayalam, Sanskrit, English and Urdu.

== Music career ==
=== 1960s–1970s ===
Balasubrahmanyam debuted as a playback singer on 15 December 1966 with the song "Emiyee Vinta Moham" for Sri Sri Sri Maryada Ramanna, a Telugu film scored by his mentor, S. P. Kodandapani. The first non-Telugu song that he recorded was in Kannada in 1966 for the film Nakkare Ade Swarga, starring T. R. Narasimharaju. He recorded his first Tamil song "Athaanodu Ippadi Irundhu Eththanai Naalaachu", a duet with L. R. Eswari under the musical direction of M. S. Viswanathan for the film Hotel Ramba, which never released. The song "Medante Meda Kaadu" from the film Sukha Dukhalu (1968) composed by Kondandapani brought him recognition in Telugu cinema.

Other early songs he sang were duets with P. Susheela, "Iyarkai Ennum Ilaya Kanni" in the 1969 film Shanti Nilayam, starring Gemini Ganesan, and "Aayiram Nilavae Vaa" for M. G. Ramachandran in Adimaippenn. His first song with S. Janaki was "Pournami Nilavil Pani Vizhum Iravil" in Kanni Penn. He was then introduced to the Malayalam film industry by G. Devarajan in the film Kadalppalam. As per Balasubrahmanyam, "Ye Divilo Virisina Parijathamo" from the 1973 Telugu film Kannevayasu composed by Satyam gave an amazing turning point to his singing career.

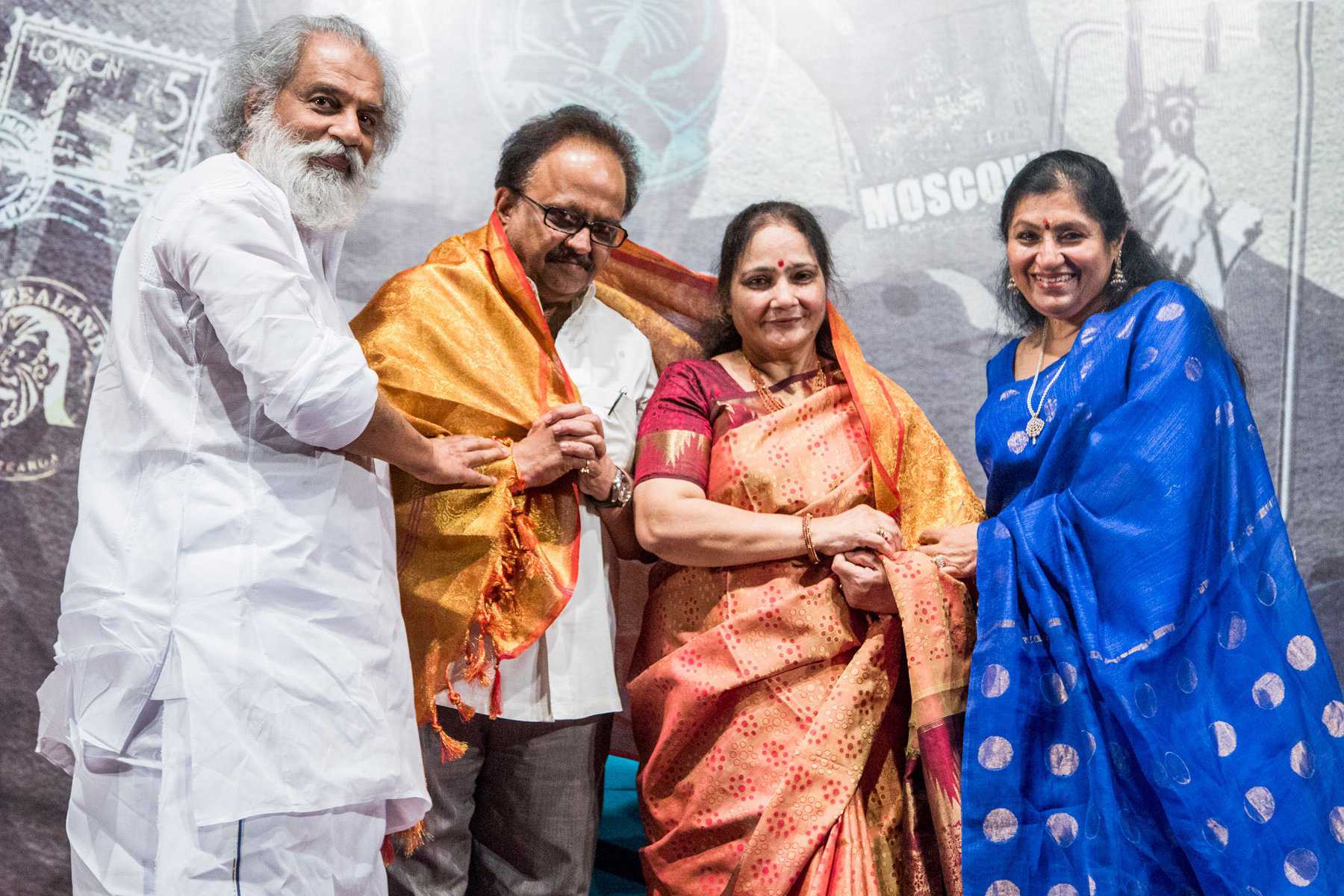
Balasubrahmanyam and his wife being congratulated by K. J. Yesudas and his wife

Balasubrahmanyam recorded the most songs on a single day by any singer. He had recorded 21 songs in Kannada for the composer Upendra Kumar in Bangalore from 9:00 am to 9:00 pm on 8 February 1981 and 19 songs in Tamil, 16 songs in Hindi in a day. In his words, "There were days when I used to record 15–20 songs, but only for Anand Milind. And I would take the last flight back to Chennai." In the 1970s, he also worked with M. S. Viswanathan in Tamil movies for actors such as M. G. Ramachandran, Sivaji Ganesan and Gemini Ganesan. He recorded duets with P. Susheela, S. Janaki, Vani Jayaram and L. R. Eswari. Balasubrahmanyam's association with Ilaiyaraaja began even before Ilaiyaraaja came to the cine field. In the early days, he used to sing in towns and villages all over south India and Ilaiyaraaja, then an unknown harmonium and guitar player accompanied him in his concerts.

=== 1980s ===
Balasubrahmanyam gained international recognition with the 1980 film Sankarabharanam. The film is considered to be one of the best films ever to emerge from the Telugu film industry. Directed by K. Viswanath, the film's soundtrack was composed by K. V. Mahadevan and led to an increase in the usage of Carnatic music in Telugu cinema as well as in other languages. Not a classically trained singer, he used a "film music" aesthetic in recording the songs. Balasubrahmanyam received his first National Film Award for Best Male Playback Singer for his work. His first work in Hindi films was in the following year, in Ek Duuje Ke Liye (1981), for which he received another National Film Award for Best Male Playback Singer.

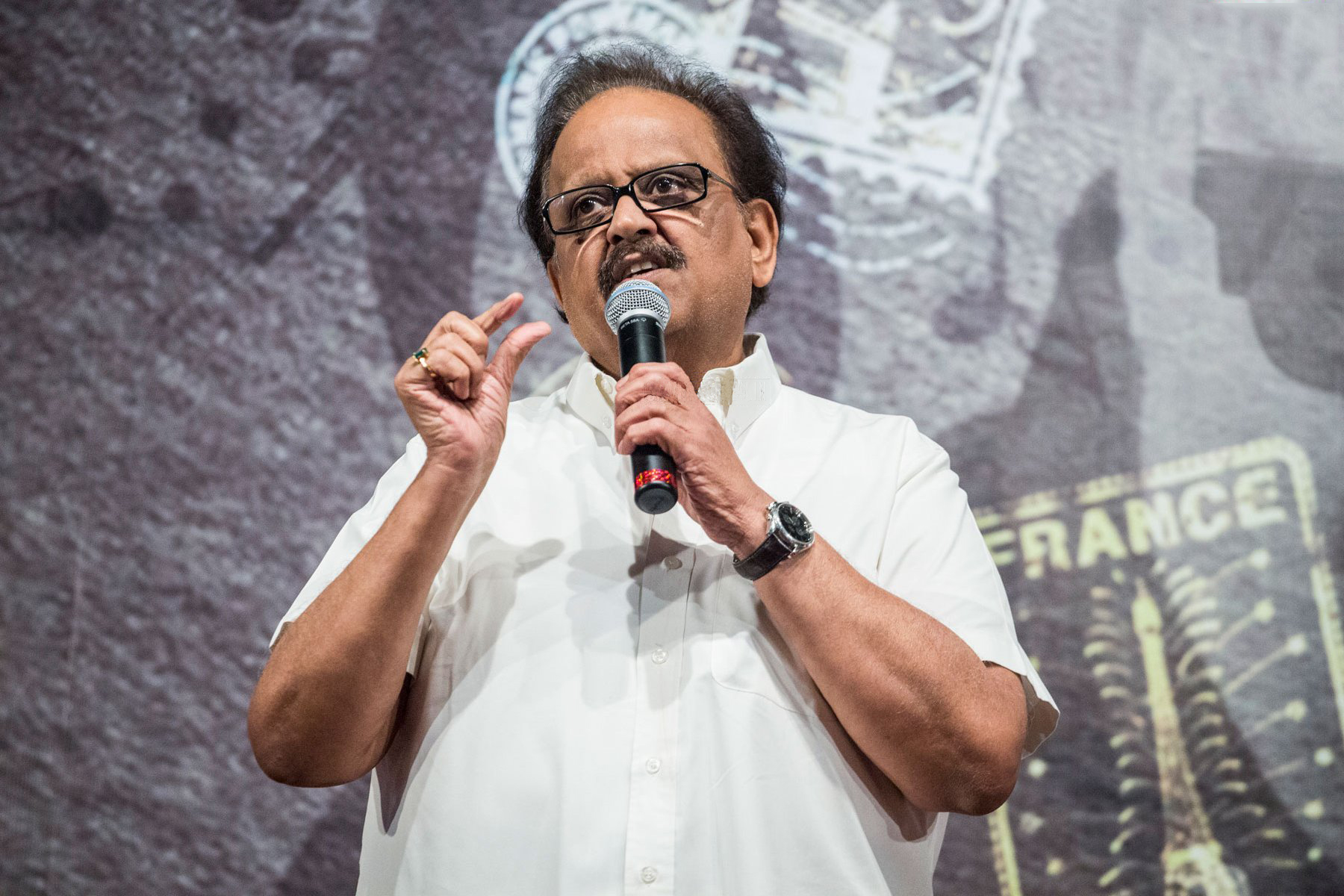
Balasubrahmanyam in 2019

Balasubrahmanyam began to record more songs in Telugu and other South Indian languages, especially for Ilaiyaraaja with S. Janaki, the trio considered to be highly successful in the Tamil film industry from the late 1970s and throughout the 1980s. The songs were based on classical music, such as in Saagara Sangamam (1983) and Rudraveena (1988), for which Ilaiyaraaja and Balasubrahmanyam won National Awards for Best Music Director and Best Male Playback Singer respectively. South Indian actor Chiranjeevi said that SPB's voice is one of the main reasons for his success.

In 1989, Balasubrahmanyam was the playback singer for actor Salman Khan in Maine Pyar Kiya. The soundtrack for the film won a Filmfare Award for Best Male Playback Singer for the song Dil Deewana. For much of the next decade, Balasubrahmanyam continued as the "romantic singing voice" on the soundtracks of Khan's films. Notable among these was Hum Aapke Hain Koun..! which became the highest-grossing Hindi film of all time. Balasubrahmanyam's duet with Lata Mangeshkar, "Didi Tera Devar Deewana", was very popular. SP Balasubrahmanyam became identified as Salman Khan's voice in the 90s just like Kishore Kumar became Rajesh Khanna's voice through the 70s.

=== 1990s ===
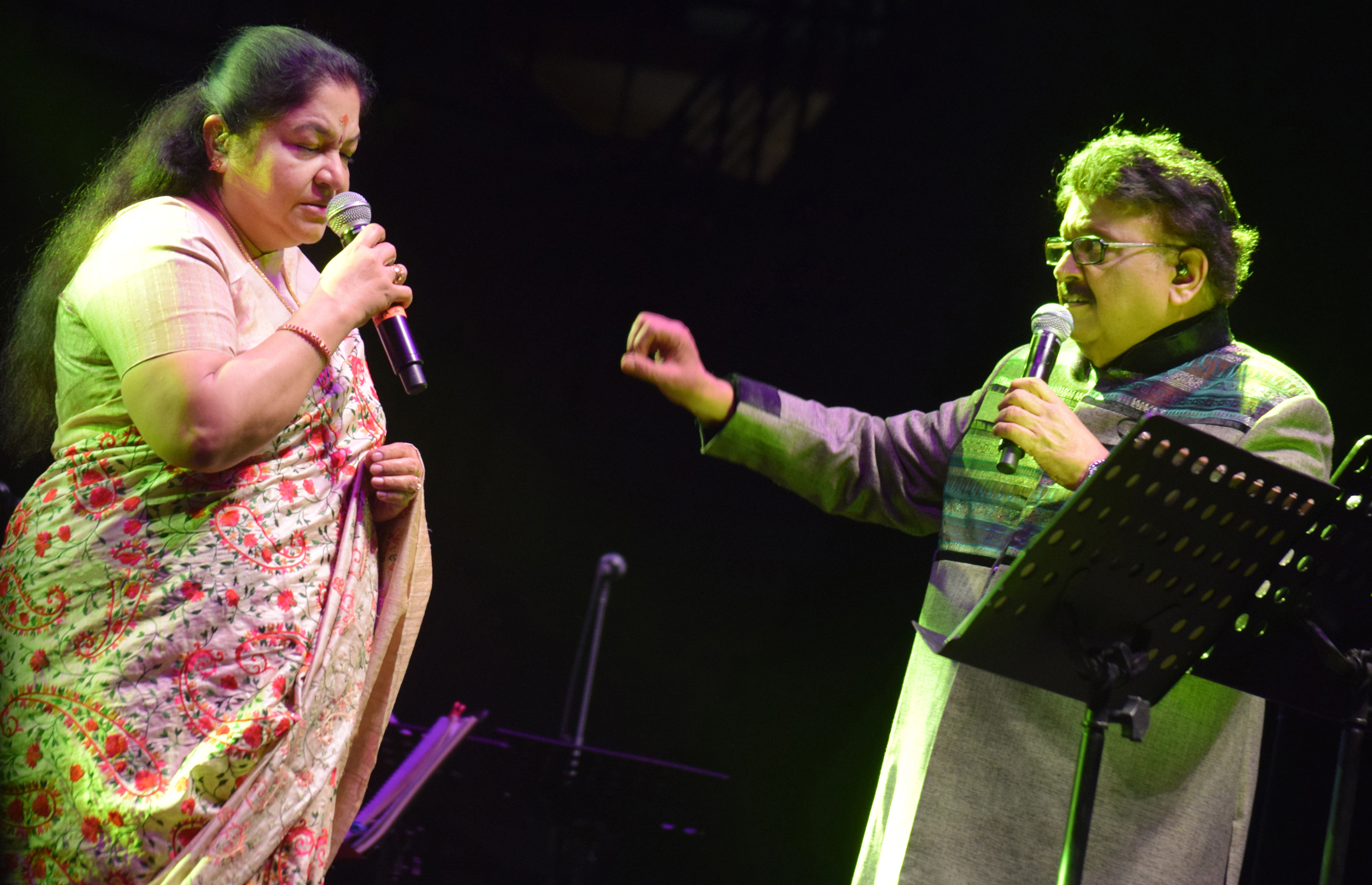
Balasubrahmanyam and K. S. Chitra performing at Celebrating 50 years of musical journey of S. P. Balasubrahmanyam on 9 December 2016 at Duty Free Tennis Stadium, Dubai

In the 1990s, he worked with composers such as Vidyasagar, M. M. Keeravani, Hamsalekha, S. A. Rajkumar and Deva among others, but his association with A. R. Rahman turned out be a major success.

Balasubrahmanyam recorded three songs for A. R. Rahman in the latter's debut film Roja. He had a long-time association with Rahman right from Roja. Other popular songs include "July Maadham" from Pudhiya Mugam, which also marked the debut of singer Anupama, "Mannoothu Manthayilae" from Kizhakku Cheemayile which was a folk number and he almost sang all songs in the musical love story Duet and "Thanga Thaamarai" from Minsara Kanavu which fetched him, the sixth and latest of his National Film Awards for Best Male Playback Singer to date.

Balasubrahmanyam's association with Hamsalekha began after the latter's successful venture Premaloka in Kannada. Balasubrahmanyam sang the most songs for Hamsalekha in Kannada. He received his fourth National Film Award for Best Male Playback Singer for the song "Umandu Ghumandu" from the Kannada film Ganayogi Panchakshari Gavayi (1995), which was a Hindustani classical music-based composition by Hamsalekha.

=== 2000–2020 ===
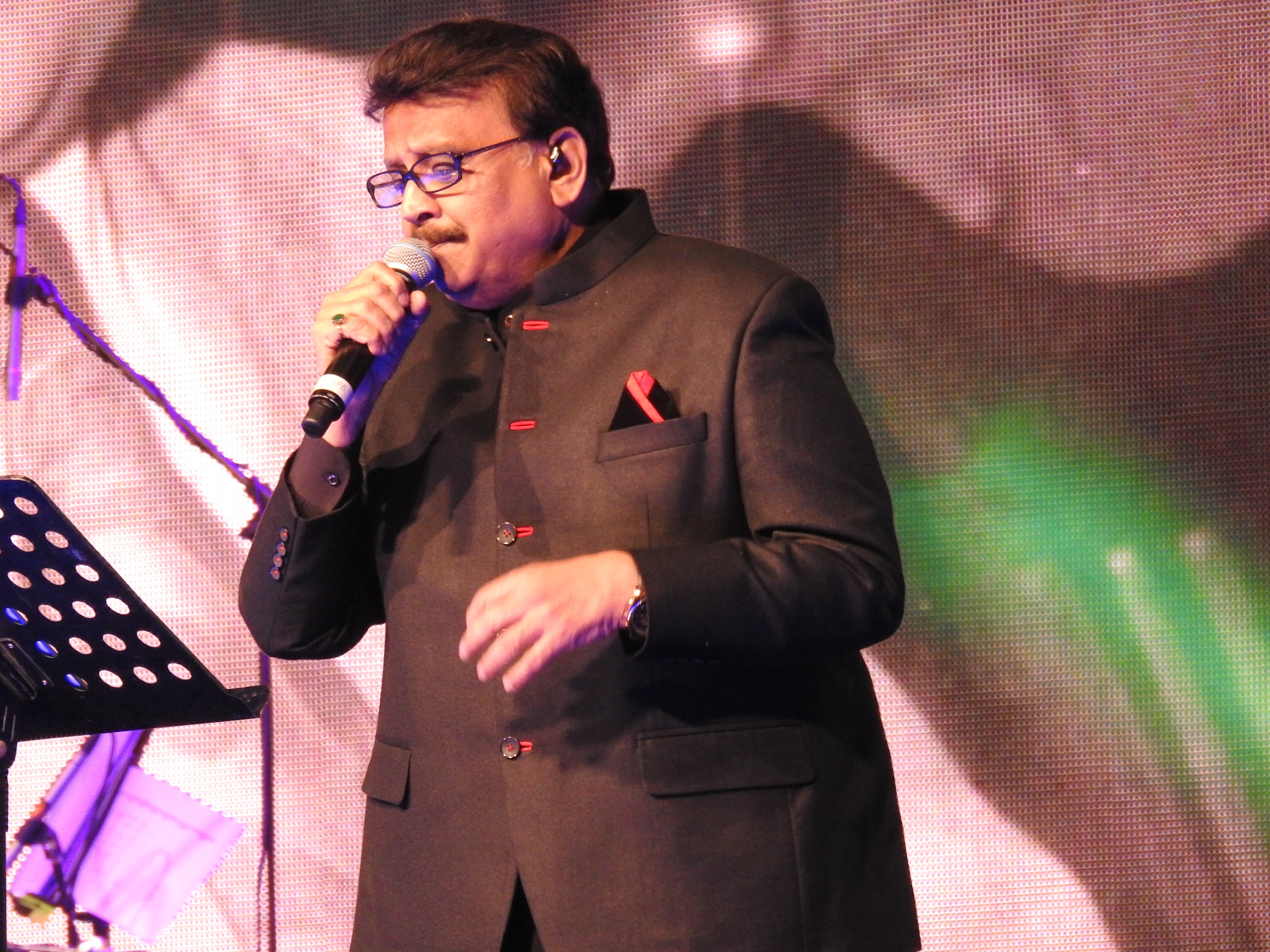
S. P. Balasubrahmanyam performing in Singapore

In 2013, Balasubrahmanyam recorded the title song for Chennai Express, singing for the lead actor Shah Rukh Khan, under the music direction of Vishal–Shekhar, breaking his 15-year hiatus from Hindi cinema music.

SPB is the only singer having a long spanning career of 54 years having at least two songs to record per day, even in his last days.

In May 2020, SPB crooned a song on humanity titled "Bharath Bhoomi" which was composed by Ilaiyaraaja as a tribute to the people such as police, doctors, nurses and janitors who have been significantly working amid COVID-19 pandemic. The video song was officially unveiled by Ilaiyaraaja through his official YouTube account on 30 May 2020 in both Tamil and Hindi languages.

== Selected discography ==
He also worked as a composer for 45 films:

- Sandharbha (1978; Kannada)
- Toorpu Velle Railu (1979; Telugu)
- Thudikkum Karangal (1983; Tamil)
- Seethamma Pelli (1984; Telugu)
- Mayuri (1985; Telugu)
- Devarelliddane (1985; Kannada)
- Bete (1986; Kannada)
- Sowbhagya Lakshmi (1987; Kannada)
- Ramanna Shamanna (1988; Kannada)
- Jockey (1989; Kannada)
- Sigaram (1991; Tamil)
- Thaiyalkaran (1991; Tamil)
- Belliyappa Bangarappa (1992; Kannada)
- Muddina Maava (1993; Kannada)
- Angaiyalli Apsare (1993; Kannada)
- Unnai Charanadaindhen (2003; Tamil) (songs only)

== Other work ==
=== Voice acting ===
Balasubrahmanyam accidentally became a dubbing artist with K. Balachander's film Manmadha Leela (1976), the dubbed Telugu version of Manmadha Leelai. He has also provided voice-overs for various artists, including Kamal Haasan, Rajinikanth, Vishnuvardhan, Salman Khan, K. Bhagyaraj, Mohan, Anil Kapoor, Girish Karnad, Gemini Ganesan, Arjun Sarja, Nagesh, Karthik and Raghuvaran in various languages. He was assigned as the default dubbing artist for Kamal Haasan in Telugu-dubbed versions of Tamil films. For the Telugu version of Dasavathaaram, he gave voice to seven characters (including the female character) out of ten characters played by Kamal Haasan. He was awarded the Nandi Award for Best Male Dubbing Artist for the films Annamayya and Sri Sai Mahima. He dubbed for Nandamuri Balakrishna for the Tamil version of the movie Sri Rama Rajyam in 2012. He also dubbed for Ben Kingsley in the Telugu-dubbed version of Gandhi.

=== Television shows and films ===
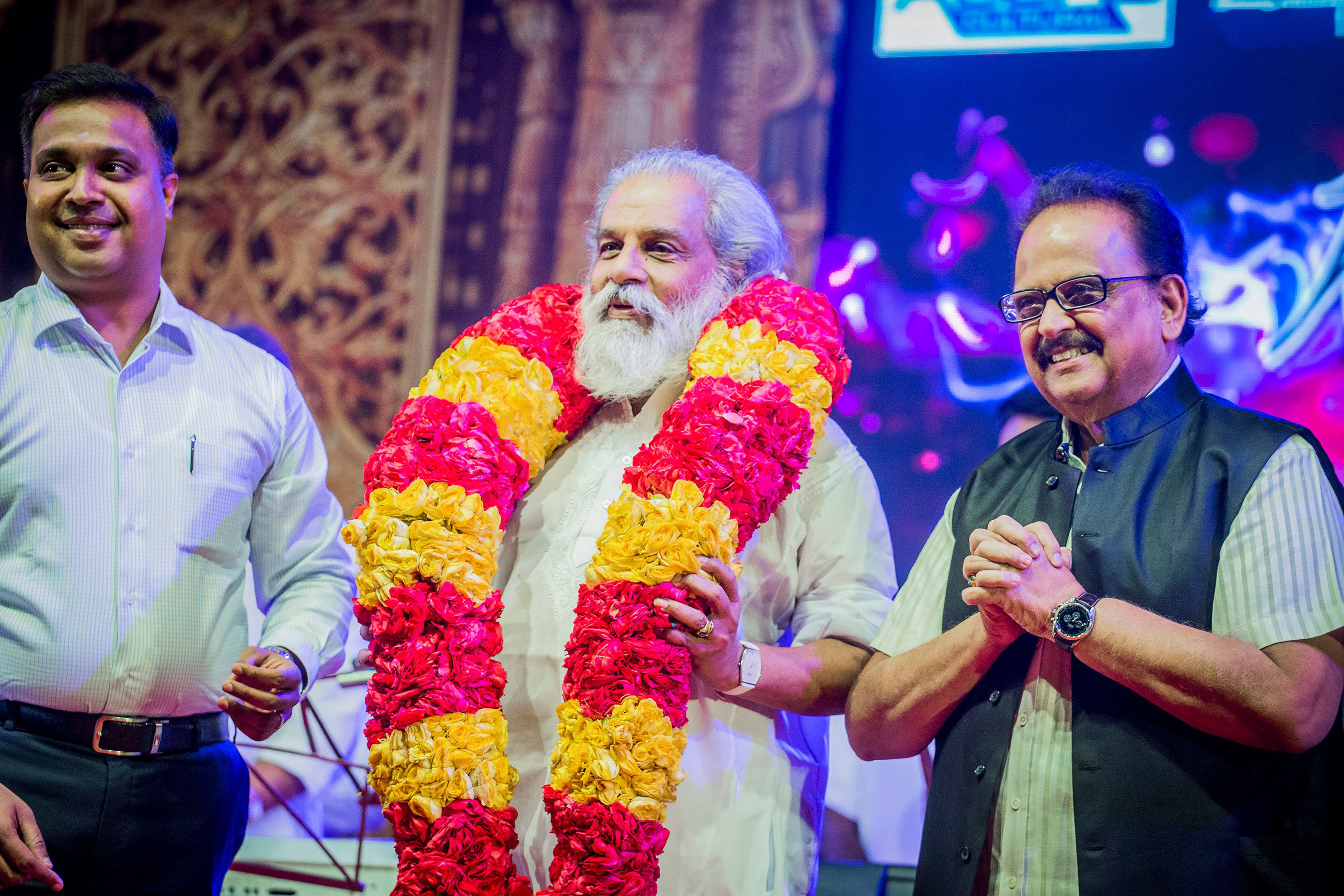
S. P. B with K. J. Yesudas

Balasubrahmanyam hosted and judged Telugu musical reality TV show Padutha Theeyaga, which marked his television debut. Starting from 1996, the show is credited for unearthing singing talents from Andhra Pradesh and Telangana. Singers like Usha, Kousalya, Gopika Poornima, Mallikarjun, Hemachandra, N. C. Karunya, Smita etc., have debuted in the show. He also hosted and judged Kannada musical reality TV show Ede Thumbi Haaduvenu. Balasubrahmanyam also appeared in other shows such as Paadalani Undi, Endaro Mahanubahvulu and Swarabhishekam.

== Personal life ==
Balasubrahmanyam was married in 1969 to Savithri and has two children, a daughter Pallavi, and a son S. P. Charan, also a playback singer and film producer.

Having no formal training, Balasubrahmanyam considered S. P. Kodandapani, who gave him his first singing offer and mentored him in his early career, to be his guru. He would reminisce about him throughout his life and would often pay tributes to him. He named his recording theatre after him. He also named his film production company after him as 'Sri Kodandapani Film Circuits'. He also idolised Mohammed Rafi.

== Illness and death ==
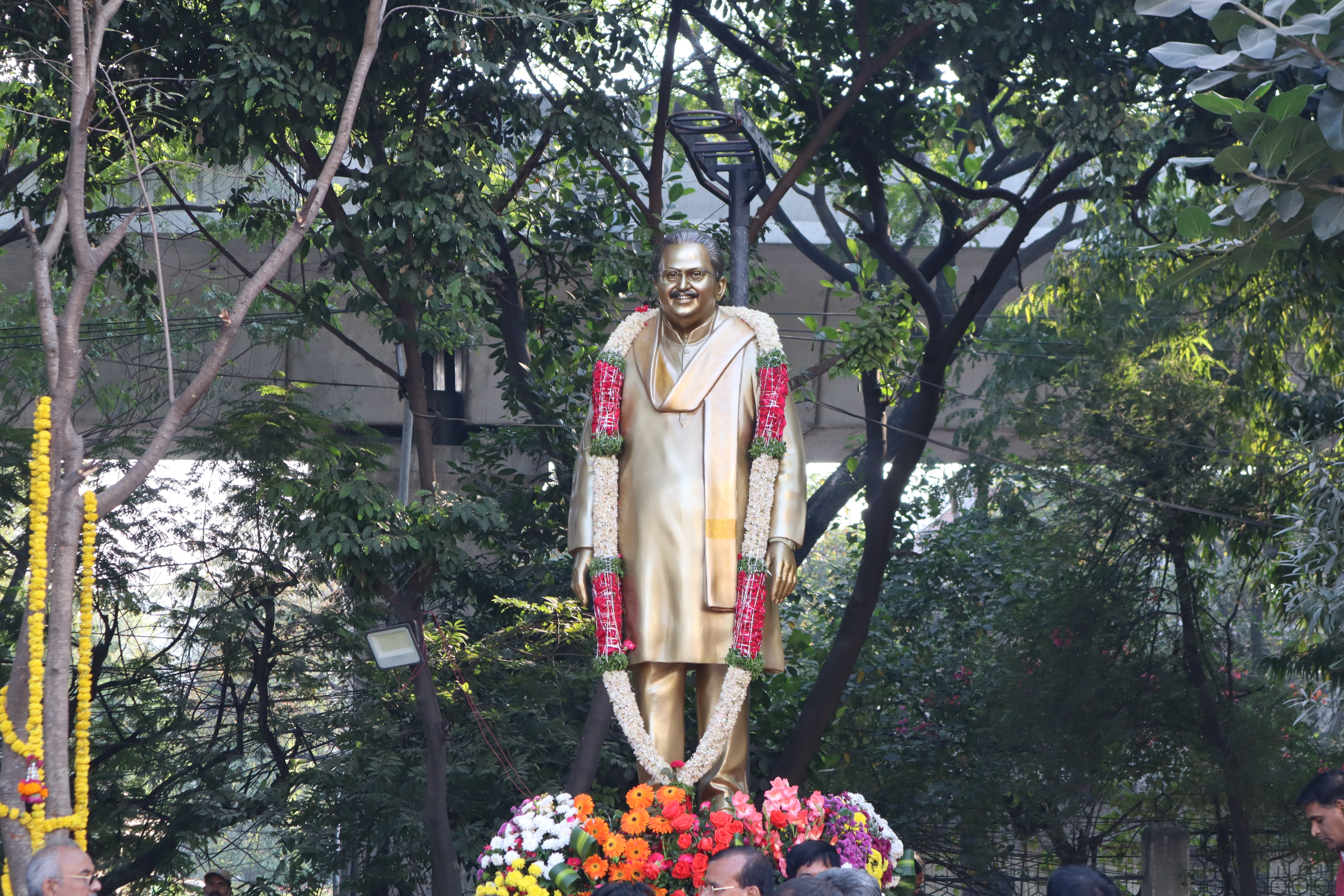
S.P. Balasubrahmanyam’s statue at Ravindra Bharathi in Hyderabad

On 5 August 2020, Balasubrahmanyam tested positive for COVID-19 during the COVID-19 pandemic in India and was admitted to MGM Healthcare in Chennai. Subsequently, his health deteriorated and he was shifted to the intensive care unit in a critical state. He required a ventilator and extracorporeal membrane oxygenation (ECMO) support. It was reported that his age (74 years) and multiple co-morbidities, such as diabetes, that worsened his condition. Filmmakers and musicians from the Tamil film industry met virtually and live-streamed a mass prayer on August 20, while Telugu and Kannada film industries had the same of their own on different dates. Candlelight vigils were held by fans outside the hospital. On 7 September 2020, Balasubrahmanyam tested negative for the coronavirus, although he remained using a ventilator and ECMO. He started showing signs of recovery, including light speech and physical activities. However, the hospital released a statement on 24 September stating that he became "extremely critical" and was on "maximal life support".

Balasubrahmanyam died on 25 September 2020 at 1:04 pm (IST) of cardio-respiratory arrest after over a month-long hospitalisation. He was buried at his farm house in Thamaraipaakkam, Thiruvallur district with state honours on 26 September 2020.

== Awards and nominations ==
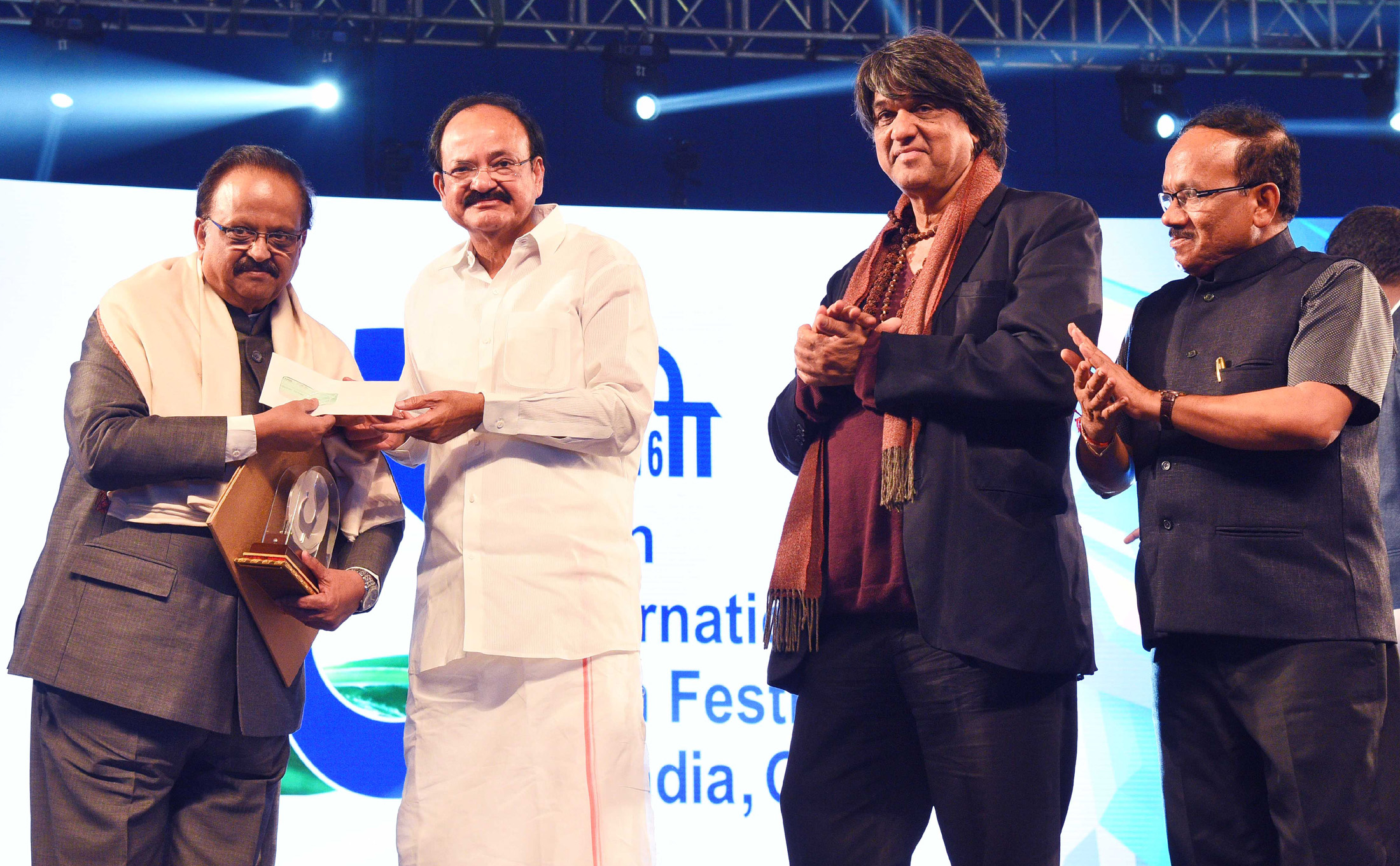
Then Vice President Venkaiah Naidu presenting the centenary award to S.P. Balasubrahmanyam

Throughout his career, Balasubrahmanyam has won awards not only for playback singing, but also for music direction, acting, dubbing and producing. He has won six National Film Awards for Best Male Playback Singer. He was also awarded the Kalaimamani Award by 1981, the Padma Shri in 2001 and the Padma Bhushan in 2011 and Padma Vibhushan in 2021 (Posthumously).
