= Manor House Street railway station =

Disused railway station in the East Riding of Yorkshire, England

Manor House Street
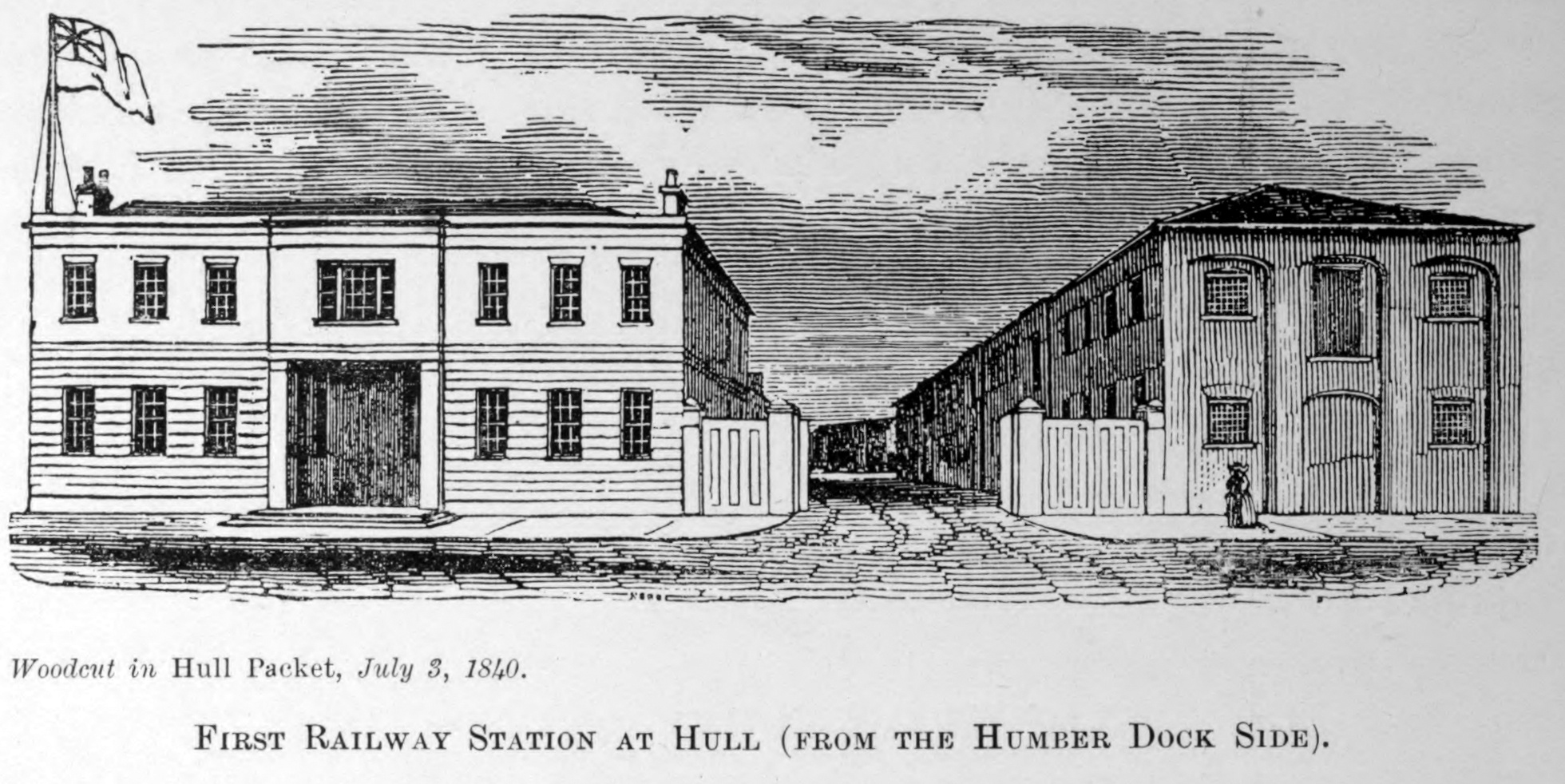
- View from Humber Dock side

General information
- Location: Kingston upon Hull; England
- Coordinates: 53.739°N 0.339°W
- Grid reference: TA096282

Other information
- Status: Disused

Key dates
- 1840: Opened
- 1848: closed for passengers
- June 1853: opened for passengers
- 1854: closed for passengers
- 1960: closed for freight
Location

Manor House Street station (also known as Kingston Street station) was the original terminus station of the Hull and Selby Railway, opened in 1840 adjacent to the Humber Dock in Kingston upon Hull, England. In 1848 the station was superseded by Hull Paragon station after which it was primarily used for goods traffic.

As a goods station the facility was known as Railway Street Goods station. Most of the buildings were demolished in 1959 as part of a modernisation programme converting the English Street Goods station into a main regional depot.

Sidings remained on the site until the 1980s when housing development occupied the western part of the site. The site of the station buildings site was developed as a multi-storey housing development Freedom Quays in the 2000s.

== History ==
=== Manor House Street station (1840–1854) ===
The station was constructed as the original Hull terminus of the Hull and Selby Railway. The station was located on a site of around 5 acres (2.0 ha) adjacent to the Humber Dock and Kingston Street. The main building was a two-storey structure of white brick and stone, known as Railway Office, was constructed facing onto Humber Dock. The office was 100 by 70 feet (30 by 21 m) deep by wide with waiting rooms, and ticket and parcel offices on the ground floor; a passage led from the station front to the train shed behind; the first floor contained the company offices including the director's room. The design is thought to be by James Walker and John Timperley, with Simminson & Hutchinson as the building contractors, ironwork by James Young.

The main train shed was 170 by 72 feet (52 by 22 m) long by wide, connected at the east end to the offices, with trains arriving at the west end. There were four lines of track, and raised platforms at either side; the trainshed roof was supported on cast iron columns. An exit in the north wall led to a station road, which separated the passenger station from the goods shed to the north.

The railways workshops of around 5,000 square yards (4,200 m^{2}) were located west of the station, also facing Kingston Street, and included facilities for engine, wagon and carriage work, with power supplied by a 10 hp stationary engine. (Note: 53.7388°N 0.3408°W Hull and Selby railway, Hull workshops)

The goods shed and warehouse was a two-storey building 270 by 45 feet (82 by 14 m) long by wide, with a single line of track within, and two on either side, all running the entire length. Within the building the floor was 2 feet (0.61 m) above the level the track for ease of loading. The second floor had access to the lower throughout the shed, allowing movement from train to warehouse under cover. In addition to the goods warehouse the company had a wharf nearby at Limekiln Creek. (Note: 53.7368°N 0.3424°W Hull and Selby railway, Limekiln Creek warehouse)

On the opening day (1 July 1840) after a return trip from Hull to Selby a banquet with speeches was held in the upper warehouse. Public services started on 2 July, and goods service on 19 August.

Initially passenger trains pulled into the station by a rope and capstan – this led to an accident where the uncontrolled momentum imparted led to the train crashing through the booking office wall. Later the train would have the engine detached, run round and used to shunt the train backwards into the trainshed. The railway followed the practice used on early British railways of stopping the train outside the station for ticket inspections.

In 1847 an act of Parliament allowed the construction of a new station, this opened in May 1848 as Hull Paragon station, and the station at Kingston Street closed to passengers. From June 1853 a suburban service of passenger trains running on the Victoria Dock Branch Line began terminating at the Station, running to and from Victoria Dock. The service was ended in 1854.

=== Railway Street goods station (1854–1961) ===
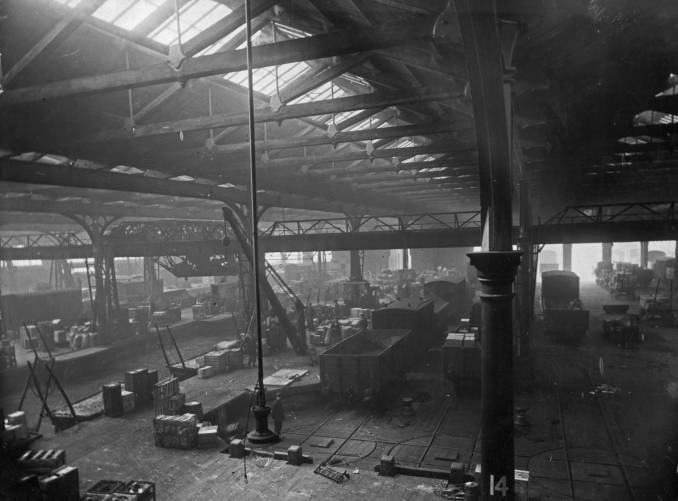
Railway Street goods interior (1905)

After the opening of Paragon station the old station was used as a goods station. Expansion was soon required and land including the old Gaol (west of Manor House Street) and houses on Bell Vue Terrace were acquired and demolished and the station expanded. In 1858 the existing buildings were demolished and the site redeveloped in one piece as a goods station.

The new goods station was designed by NER architect Thomas Prosser; the main building was 300 feet (91 m) long, initially with four platforms. The station was expanded in the mid-1860s increasing the number of platforms to right. A second shed was added to the west adjoining Railway Street. Built for the NER, the warehouse also provide service to other railways with running powers to Hull; the Lancashire and Yorkshire Railway and London and North Western Railway; the Manchester, Sheffield and Lincolnshire Railway used a wharfe and warehouse at Limekiln creek for lighter services across the Humber, replaced c. 1866 with a new warehouse and water channel at Railway Creek, built as replacement for the loss of the former during the construction of the new West Dock.

In 1959 a modernisation plan envisaged converting the English Street Goods station into one of the seven main depots in BR's North-eastern region, to be known as Hull Central goods depot. The Railway Street station was demolished in 1961.

The Railway Street site remained in use as part of the Central Good's operations (opened October 1960) handling wagonload traffic and used for storage.

Some sidings remained on the site until 1984, when housing was built on the entrance tracks. Much of the station site was redeveloped as Freedom Quays, a housing and multi-storey car park development between 2003 and 2008; the northern part is used as a Ship chandler; Hull Marina's boat yard is also located on the site.
