= General Beckett =

General Beckett may refer to:

- Charles Edward Beckett (1849–1925), British Army brigadier general
- Clifford Thomason Beckett (1891–1972), British Army major general
- Edwin Beckett (1937–2018), British Army major general
- John Beckett (American football) (1892–1981), U.S. Marine Corps brigadier general
- Tom Beckett (born 1962), British Army lieutenant general
- William Beckett (engineer) (1862–1956), British Army brigadier general
