= John Edward Jones =

John Edward Jones may refer to:

- John Edward Jones (sculptor) (1806–1862), Irish civil engineer and sculptor
- John E. Jones III (born 1955), American lawyer
- John Edward Jones (American politician) (1840–1896), American politician
- John Edward Jones (Welsh politician) (1905–1970), Welsh political organiser
- John Edward Jones (1983–2009), caver who died in the Nutty Putty Cave

== See also ==
- John Jones (disambiguation)
