= John Timperley =

John Timperley may refer to:

- John Timperley (civil engineer) (1796–1856), British civil engineer
- John Timperley (badminton) (1931–2013), English badminton and squash player
- John Timperley (sound engineer) (1941–2006), British audio engineer

== See also ==
- Harold John Timperley (1898–1954), Australian journalist
