= Second Mahanadi Rail Bridge =

Bridge in India

- Coordinates: 20°29′07″N 85°54′38″E
- Carries: Kharagpur-Puri line, Howrah-Chennai main line
- Crosses: Mahanadi River
- Locale: Cuttack

Characteristics
- Total length: 2,100 metres (6,900 ft)

History
- Opened: 2008

Location
- Interactive map of Second Mahanadi Rail Bridge

The Second Mahanadi Rail Bridge is a rail bridge over the Mahanadi near Cuttack in the Indian state of Odisha.

The first Mahanadi Rail Bridge was opened on 1 January 1899. It had 64 spans of 100 feet (30 meters) each, on wells 19 ft 6 in (5.94 meters) in diameter sunk to 60 ft (18 meters) below low water level. The engineer in charge of construction of the first Mahanadi Rail Bridge was William Beckett, who won a gold medal from the Institution of Civil Engineers in 1901 for a paper he presented on the bridge construction.

The 2.1 km (1.3 mi) long Second Mahanadi Rail Bridge was built at a cost of ₹120 crore (US$13 million) and commissioned in 2008. The bridge has been designed for a train speed of 160 km per hour (99.41 miles per hour). "Adequate steps" are said to have been taken to ensure the bridge can withstand earthquake shocks.

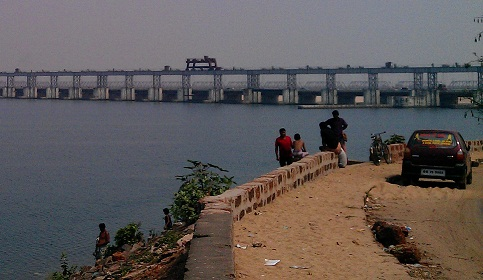

== See also ==
- List of longest bridges in the world
- List of longest bridges above water in India
