= W. N. T. Beckett =

Royal Navy officer

Captain W. N. T. Beckett MVO DSC
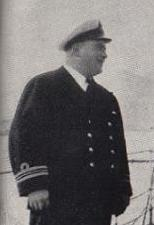
- Born: 25 March 1893
- Died: 10 March 1941 (aged 47)
- Military career
- Allegiance: United Kingdom
- Branch: Royal Navy
- Service years: 1906–1941
- Rank: Captain
- Commands: HM Coastal Motor Boat 4 HM Coastal Motor Boat 14; HM Coastal Motor Boat 86c HMS Vendetta; HMS Velox; HMS Vendetta; HMS Amazon; HMS Winchester; HMS Centurion; HMS Drake; HMS Exeter
- Conflicts: First World War; Battle of Heligoland Bight; Battle of Dogger Bank; Russian Civil War; North Russia intervention; Second World War
- Awards: Member of the Victorian Order; Distinguished Service Cross; Mentioned in Dispatches

Captain Walter Napier Thomason Beckett MVO DSC (25 March 1893 – 10 March 1941) was a noted Royal Navy officer in both the First World War and the Second World War. He was known to most people as "Joe" Beckett, after a famous British boxer of the same era, as they shared the same surname. Beckett was also a capable amateur boxer, holding the title of Royal Navy Heavyweight boxing champion for some time.

In Fabulous Admirals and some naval fragments published in 1957, Beckett is described as "an Elizabethan character, who was rough, tough, large and strong, and his words smelt of tar, spunyarn, sound commonsense and humour." The author, Commander Geoffrey Lowis RN, included a chapter on Beckett whom he thought a great character.

== Early life ==
Beckett was born in Bilaspur in the Central Provinces of India on 25 March 1893. He was the younger son of Brigadier-General William Thomas Clifford Beckett CBE, DSO, VD (1862–1956) and Bessie Drummond Thomason, daughter of Major-General Charles Simeon Thomason (1833–1911) of the Bengal Royal Engineers. His older brother Clifford became Major-General Clifford Thomason Beckett CB, CBE, MC (1891–1972) of the Royal Artillery, who had a distinguished military career including being Acting General Officer Commanding Malta in 1942.

Prior to his military career Beckett's father William had been a senior Civil Engineer, working on behalf of the Indian government. At the time of W.N.T. Beckett's birth, his father was in charge of constructing the first railway bridges over the Orissa rivers on the East Coast Extension of the Bengal – Nagpur Railway, completing the connection between the cities of Calcutta and Madras. In 1901, he was awarded the Gold Medal from the Institution of Civil Engineers for a paper he presented on his completed project.

The family returned to Great Britain for the boys education, and lived near Grantown-on-Spey in Scotland, where Beckett loved wandering the hills and glens of Speyside.

Beckett boarded at Park House School in Kent and in 1906 he entered the Royal Naval College, Osborne, where he excelled at sports and became friends with fellow cadet Prince Edward, the future King Edward VIII. Beckett won innumerable cups and medals for boxing, bayonet fighting, sabres and foils at the Naval Colleges, and later in the fleet and at the Royal Naval and Military Tournament.

Prince Edward and Beckett both joined the battleship HMS Hindustan as midshipmen in August 1911, and served together for a period of three months, until Edward was sent to Magdalen College, Oxford, for further studies.

After two years as a midshipman Beckett was promoted to Acting Sub-Lieutenant and he was also playing fullback in the Navy rugger team.

== World War I ==
=== Harwich Force ===
Beckett served as Sub-Lieutenant in the destroyer HMS Legion, of Commodore Reginald Tyrwhitt's Harwich force, and took part in the Battle of Heligoland Bight and the Battle of Dogger Bank. It was about this time he brought out a pamphlet, subsequently published by the Admiralty, Questions in Dutch and German for Boarding Officers. When HMS Amphion, the first Royal Naval ship to be sunk during the First World War, was going down, Beckett was aboard searching for survivors, and became the hero of a tale often told. Amphion blew up and Beckett found himself sailing through the air amongst a cloud of bric-a-brac, and amongst it was the wardroom clock, of which Beckett observed the time as he tumbled through the air and into the sea.

During his time on Legion, Beckett developed a reputation as an excellent seaman, and a practitioner of fine nautical skills and knot-work. These skills and his attention to detail became legendary in the Service, and many shoddy jobs were discarded with the words, "That would never do for Joe Beckett".

While Beckett was serving with the Harwich Force, he was befriended by the renowned English author Rudyard Kipling, and was invited to his home Bateman's, in East Sussex. Kipling was very interested in the Royal Navy, and used Beckett as a source of information for his 1916 naval classic, "Sea Warfare". In one of Kipling's letters, he colourfully describes his meeting with Lieutenant Beckett, and states "he held us breathless or weak with laughter". Beckett also enjoyed their meeting, and went on to visit Bateman's again. He found they had various common interests, including a connection to India, where both men had been born. Kipling had previously based the character Findlayson, the hero of his story The Bridge Builders on Beckett's great uncle, the well known Indian bridge-builder Frederick Thomas Granville Walton.

=== Coastal Motor Boats (DSC) ===
From April 1916 until the end of the First World War, Beckett was employed in Coastal Motor Boats (CMB's), with a group of bright young officers known as the 'Suicide Club'.

In May 1916, Beckett took command of the newly built HM Coastal Motor Boat 4, designed by Sir John Thornycroft. CMB No. 4 was one of a series of small, shallow draft vessels used during World War I. Operated by a crew of three, it was capable of 24.8 knots (28.5 mph; 45.9 km/h). The main armament was a single 18-inch (457 mm) torpedo in a trough abaft the cockpit (from which it was launched tail-first over the stern by a cordite-powered ram). It also had four .303 in Lewis machine guns.

While in command of CMB No. 4, Beckett carried out duties of CMB Flotilla Signal Officer, and he trained personnel and conducted smoke trials and experiments.

In August 1916, he took command of 3rd Division CMB Flotilla. In December he proceeded to Dunkirk in charge of the division, and operated on the Belgian coast. He organised a temporary base and established liaison with French naval authorities and with the air force. Beckett was in command of a Divisional CMB attack on German destroyers at Zeebrugge on 7 April 1917, as a result one was sunk and one very seriously damaged. For these actions Beckett was Mentioned in Despatches and was awarded the Distinguished Service Cross (DSC).

In May 1917, Beckett was appointed in command of CMB No. 14, the first of a larger-type CMB carrying four depth charges in addition to a torpedo: these boats were 55 feet (17 m) long, longer than the forty-foot original type. In July Beckett was ordered to Portsmouth to form an anti-submarine CMB base there, and command the Portsmouth CMB Flotilla on anti-submarine and convoy duties. He stayed at that post until September 1918, when he was transferred to CMB Base Osea Island, where he was in charge of half 2nd CMB flotilla. During this time he wrote the CMB Signal Table for the Admiralty. He continued in that position until after the Armistice on 11 November 1918.

=== North Russia and the Dwina River ===
From May to November 1919, Beckett volunteered for "Special Service" on a dangerous secret mission in North Russia using CMBs. The Bolsheviks were attacking the White Russians and Beckett was sent as Second-in-Command of CMB Flotilla – Dwina River Force, under the Senior Naval Officer, White Sea, Rear-Admiral John Green, with whom he began a long friendship. Beckett was in command of CMB No. 28A. During this time he worked with the military (on land), as a Lewis gun officer, and on mine clearance duties on the river. He was left in charge to destroy materiel at their up-river base at Troitsa, and to cover the retirement of military forces.

== Between the wars ==
Following the Russian action Beckett returned to Osea Island, but was soon made First Lieutenant of HMS Cockchafer, in which he proceeded to China to serve on the Yangtse River Patrol. In June 1921, Beckett was back in England and in charge of the HM Fishery Gunboat Boyne, on North Sea Fishery duties and minesweeping. During this time he salvaged SS Edith and towed her to Dover, but his salvage claim was disallowed.

In November 1921 he was appointed to the battleship HMS Ramillies. During this time Beckett published The boatswain's call: how it is used, and some facts about it, which was later incorporated into the Official Seamanship Manual. Beckett was made lieutenant-commander while serving aboard Ramillies.

=== Mediterranean service ===
September 1924, Beckett was appointed in command of the destroyer HMS Vendetta, in the Mediterranean Sea, under Commander-in-Chief Admiral Sir Roger Keyes. In October 1924, HMS Vendetta proceeded to the Red Sea and Beckett acted as Senior Naval Officer (SNO) at Jeddah during operations between Ibn Saud and Emir Ali, to safeguard British interests and property. Beckett was then ordered to Port Sudan, to take charge as SNO and to arrange the evacuation of the Egyptian Army from Khartoum, after the assassination of Sir Lee Oliver Stack, the British Governor-General of Sudan and Egyptian army commander.

=== Royal service ===
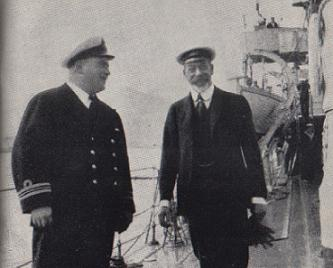
Lieutenant-Commander Beckett & King George V aboard HMS Vendetta, April 1925

Beckett had one of his most pleasant duties in March and April 1925, when HMS Vendetta and another destroyer were chosen to accompany the Royal Yacht on a cruise of the Mediterranean. The purpose of the cruise was for King George V to recuperate after a period of serious illness. The King was joined by Queen Mary; Prince George, Duke of Kent; Princess Victoria; and their party. During the cruise Beckett had the opportunity to spend time with the royal family, and upon the completion of their cruise, King George V appointed Beckett a Member of the Royal Victorian Order (MVO) for the services he had given during their cruise.

On 14 April 1927, he was appointed in command of HMS Velox in the Atlantic Fleet. During this period Beckett began to court Gladys Hemery Lindon, an heiress of an old Welsh family, the Edwardes of Rhyd-y-gors. In 1928 they wed, and were deeply in love. He always referred to her as his 'Snowdrop'. They settled at her home, St Regulus, near Southampton, and soon after Beckett was promoted to the rank of commander. On 21 February 1935 their daughter Rosemary Caroline Rowan Beckett was born.

=== Scuttling of HMY Britannia ===
In 1936, Beckett was selected by the Commander-in-Chief, Portsmouth, Admiral Sir John Kelly GCVO, KCB for an unusual task. Beckett had served under Sir John Kelly in the past, and the two were on very good terms. After the death of King George V, King Edward VIII asked Sir John Kelly to organise the scuttling of the cutter Britannia, as it was allegedly George V's dying wish. Kelly felt there was no better man for the job than Beckett, who had just been promoted to the rank of captain, and was in command of the destroyer Winchester. On 10 July 1936, Winchester towed the stripped hull of the cutter out past the Isle of Wight to St Catherine's Deep, and in the presence of Sir Philip Hunloke, who had so often sailed the cutter for the King during her racing career, Britannia was scuttled by Captain Beckett.

== World War II ==
Prior to the Second World War, Beckett went through the Senior Officers Technical Course and Senior Officers War Course, briefly had command of the 7th Destroyer Flotilla, then command of the light cruiser Gloucester for trials. In January 1939 he was appointed Captain of the Dockyard, Deputy Superintendent and King's Harbour Master of HMNB Devonport. When offered command of the York-class heavy cruiser Exeter became available, Beckett jumped at the opportunity. She was receiving an extensive refit at Devonport Dockyard following her participation in the Battle of the River Plate. Beckett was appointed captain of the Exeter during her refit and supervised the whole process.

== Death ==
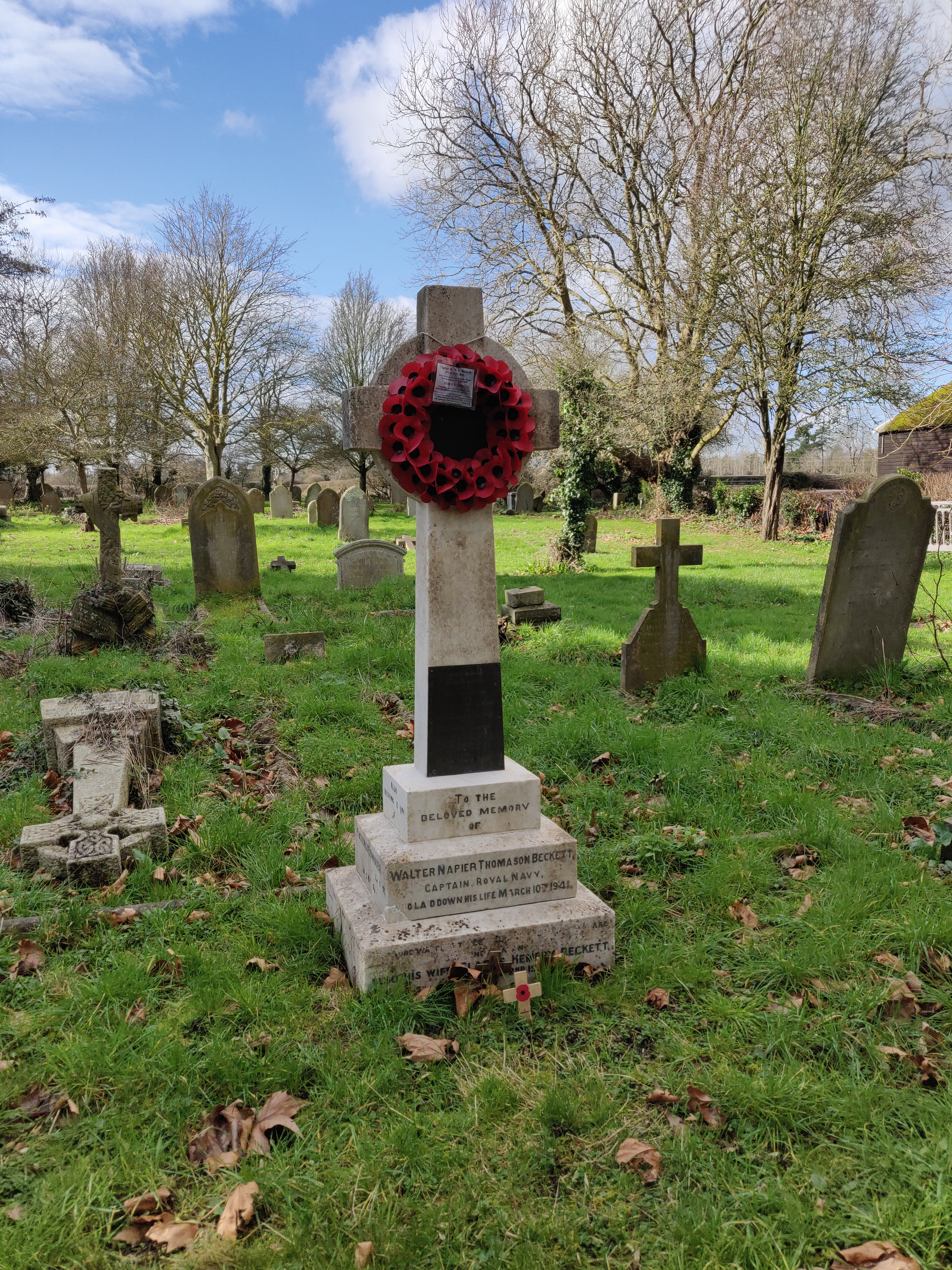
Grave in Warblington Cemetery, Hampshire

During this time Beckett's health began to fail, partially due to the heavy workload entailed in running a dockyard in time of war, and the stress of refitting Exeter, but also due to injuries he had sustained earlier in his career.

During his time on the Dwina River in North Russia, he had been exposed to poison gas, that had caused damage to his chest and lungs, and while in CMB's he had received shrapnel in his left knee. These wounds, particularly his chest, finally took their toll on him and he was sent to have chest X-rays. After a month of ill-health, through which he persevered at the dockyard, Beckett left on Friday, 7 March 1941, for the last time. He died in Saltash Hospital on 10 March after an operation.

== Legacy ==
HM Coastal Motor Boat 4, Captained by W.N.T. Beckett in 1916–1917, and used by Beckett during CMB attack on Zeebrugge, 7 April 1917, for which he was awarded DSC and mentioned in Despatches, is on permanent display at the Imperial War Museum, Duxford.

Beckett received the thanks of the Admiralty for devices he had designed (e.g. a balloon indicating device for locating fired practice torpedoes [dated 14 August 1924], a device submitted concerning a sprocket wheel for mine moorings [dated 15 November 1926]).

Buried: Havant and Waterloo (Warblington) Cemetery, sec. 2, old ground, grave 105

Beckett's published work includes:

- The boatswain's call: how it is used, and some facts about it, 1922, Gieves Ltd, Portsmouth (Later incorporated in the Official Seamanship Manual [dated 10.03.1927] ).
- A few naval customs, expressions, traditions and superstitions, 1930, Gieves Ltd, Portsmouth
- Questions in Dutch and German for Boarding Officers, 1914 (A pamphlet published by the Admiralty);
