= Alfred Pickford =

English businessman and Boy Scouts Association official (1872–1947)

- Born: 20 May 1872
- Died: 7 October 1947 (aged 75)
- Occupation: Businessman
- Known for: The Boy Scouts Association official

Sir Alfred Donald "Pickle" Pickford OBE (20 May 1872 – 7 October 1947) was an English businessman who made his wealth from jute in British India and was a Boy Scouts Association official.

Pickford was nominated as Sheriff of Calcutta in 1920 and as a member of the Indian Legislative Assembly in 1921. He was knighted in the same year.

Pickford was appointed as The Boy Scouts Association's Calcutta District Commissioner in 1916 and, in May 1919, the association promoted him to be its Chief Scout Commissioner for India. He met and accompanied Robert Baden-Powell and his wife, Olave Baden-Powell when they toured India in 1921. In 1922, having returned to England and bought a Surrey estate, The Boy Scouts Association appointed him as its Headquarters Commissioner for Overseas Scouts, a position he held until 1929. The Boy Scouts Association encouraged its branches to seek control of the Scout Movement by obtaining statutory monopolies from respective governments. This was the major purpose of the visits by Overseas Commissioners Pickford and Lt. Col. Granville Walton in the 1920s and 1930s. In 1922, Pickford became a member of the committee that wrote the inaugural constitution of the International Conference of the Boy Scout Movement. In 1930, The Boy Scouts Association appointed him as its Headquarters Commissioner of its new Development Department. In 1946, the association appointed him as its Headquarters Commissioner for Publicity.

Pickford received the OBE in the 1946 New Year Honours.
