= Granville Walton =

Colonel Granville Walton, OBE, CMG
- Granville Walton, Robert Baden-Powell and Edmund Godfrey-Faussett
- Born: 24 October 1888; Strand
- Died: 19 March 1974 (aged 85); Abingdon-on-Thames
- Occupation: Headquarters Commissioner for Overseas Scouts for The Boy Scouts Association
- Spouse: Joan McCracken (married 1924)

Colonel Granville Walton, OBE, CMG (1888-1974) served as The Boy Scouts Association Headquarters Commissioner for Overseas Scouts and, later, was Assistant Chief Scout to the Association's Chief Scout, Robert Baden-Powell, 1st Baron Baden-Powell.

== Early life ==
Walton was born in the Strand district on 19 March 1888 into a family of soldiers. His father was Frederick Walton.

== Career ==
He rose to the rank of Colonel. He was awarded the Order of the British Empire. In 1948 he was nominated for Sheriff in the King's Bench Division of the High Court of Justice and gained the ward in 1949.

In 1953 he was awarded the Order of St Michael and St George.

== Scouts ==
He devoted himself to Scouting. From the early 1920s he was secretary to The Boy Scouts Association. He was in charge of The Boy Scouts Association Headquarters Overseas Department and its overseas branches in the British Empire Dominions and Colonies and as such was responsible for contacts with the governments and travelled very often. The Boy Scouts Association encouraged its branches to seek control of the Scout Movement by obtaining statutory monopolies from respective governments. This was the major purpose of the visits by Overseas Commissioners Walton and Alfred Pickford in the 1920s and 1930s.

In 1955, Walton was awarded the Bronze Wolf, the only distinction of the World Organization of the Scout Movement, awarded by the World Scout Committee for exceptional services to world Scouting. at the 15th World Scout Conference.

== Other work ==
He resided at Longworth Manor near Abingdon-on-Thames until his death and was on the governing body of Abingdon School from 1944-1947.
