= HMS Winchester (L55) =

Destroyer of the Royal Navy

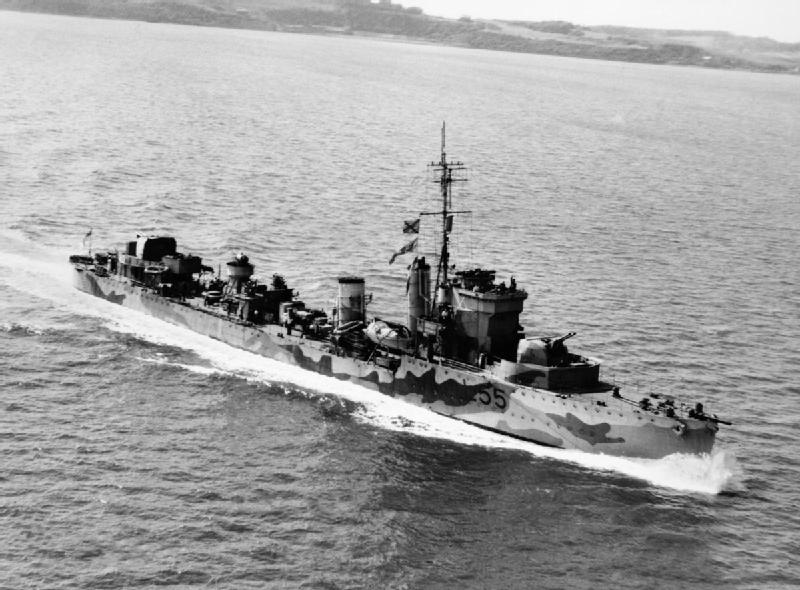

History

United Kingdom
- Name: HMS Winchester
- Builder: J. Samuel White, East Cowes, Isle of Wight
- Laid down: 12 June 1917
- Launched: 1 February 1918
- Completed: 29 April 1918
- Identification: Pennant number G43, D66, F99, H95, L55
- Motto: 'Valour makyth the man'
- Fate: Sold for scrap in March 1946
- Badge: On a Field, Party per fess Silver and red., in chief a Tudor rose red in base a castle Silver.

General characteristics
- Displacement: 1,100 tons
- Length: 300 ft (91 m) o/a, 312 ft (95 m) p/p
- Beam: 26.75 ft (8.15 m)
- Draught: 9 ft (2.7 m) standard, 11 to 25 ft (3.4 to 7.6 m) in deep
- Propulsion: 3 Yarrow type Water-tube boilers; Brown-Curtis steam turbines; 2 shafts; 27,000 shp (20,000 kW)
- Speed: 34 knots (63 km/h; 39 mph)
- Range: 320-370 tons oil, 3,500 nmi (6,500 km) at 15 knots (28 km/h; 17 mph), 900 nmi (1,700 km) at 32 knots (59 km/h; 37 mph)
- Complement: 110
- Armament: 4 × QF 4 in Mk.V (102mm L/45), mount P Mk.I; 2 × QF 2 pdr Mk.II "pom-pom" (40 mm L/39) or; 1 × QF 3 inch 20 cwt (76 mm), mount HA Mk.II; 6 (2x3) tubes for 21 in torpedoes

HMS Winchester was an Admiralty W-class destroyer of the Royal Navy. She saw service in the First and Second World Wars.

== History ==
Winchester was ordered by J. Samuel White and Company, Cowes, on the Isle of Wight as part of the 1916–1917 fleet program 10 order. Her keel was laid on 12 June 1917 and she was launched on 1 February 1918. The ship was completed on 29 April 1918.

Completed towards the end of the First World War, Winchester went on to be part of operations against the Bolsheviks in the Baltic Sea. After the Second World War the ship was placed on the reserve list, and was sold in March 1946. The ship was scrapped in Inverkeithing.

In 1936, under the command of Captain W.N.T. Beckett RN, HMS Winchester fulfilled King George V's dying wish for his beloved racing yacht HMY Britannia to follow him to the grave. Her hull was towed out to St Catherine's Deep near the Isle of Wight, and she was sunk by HMS Winchester.

== Bibliography ==
- Campbell, John (1985). Naval Weapons of World War II. Annapolis, Maryland: Naval Institute Press. ISBN 0-87021-459-4.
- Chesneau, Roger, ed. (1980). Conway's All the World's Fighting Ships 1922–1946. Greenwich, UK: Conway Maritime Press. ISBN 0-85177-146-7.
- Colledge, J. J.; Warlow, Ben (2006) [1969]. Ships of the Royal Navy: The Complete Record of All Fighting Ships of the Royal Navy from the 15th Century to the Present (3rd Rev ed.). London: Chatham Publishing. ISBN 978-1-86176-281-8. OCLC 67375475.
- Cocker, Maurice. Destroyers of the Royal Navy, 1893–1981. Ian Allan. ISBN 0-7110-1075-7.
- Friedman, Norman (2009). British Destroyers From Earliest Days to the Second World War. Annapolis, Maryland: Naval Institute Press. ISBN 978-1-59114-081-8.
- Gardiner, Robert & Gray, Randal, eds. (1985). Conway's All the World's Fighting Ships 1906–1921. Annapolis, Maryland: Naval Institute Press. ISBN 0-85177-245-5.
- Lenton, H. T. (1998). British & Empire Warships of the Second World War. Annapolis, Maryland: Naval Institute Press. ISBN 1-55750-048-7.
- March, Edgar J. (1966). British Destroyers: A History of Development, 1892–1953; Drawn by Admiralty Permission From Official Records & Returns, Ships' Covers & Building Plans. London: Seeley Service. OCLC 164893555.
- Preston, Antony (1971). 'V & W' Class Destroyers 1917–1945. London: Macdonald. OCLC 464542895.
- Raven, Alan & Roberts, John (1979). 'V' and 'W' Class Destroyers. Man o'War. Vol. 2. London: Arms & Armour. ISBN 0-85368-233-X.
- Rohwer, Jürgen (2005). Chronology of the War at Sea 1939–1945: The Naval History of World War Two (Third Revised ed.). Annapolis, Maryland: Naval Institute Press. ISBN 1-59114-119-2.
- Whinney, Bob (2000). The U-boat Peril: A Fight for Survival. Cassell. ISBN 0-304-35132-6.
- Whitley, M. J. (1988). Destroyers of World War 2. Annapolis, Maryland: Naval Institute Press. ISBN 0-87021-326-1.
- Winser, John de D. (1999). B.E.F. Ships Before, At and After Dunkirk. Gravesend, Kent: World Ship Society. ISBN 0-905617-91-6.
