= Harry Edward Jones =

British civil engineer (1843–1925)

- Born: 1843; Chester
- Died: 24 March 1925 (aged 81–82)
- Engineering career
- Discipline: Civil,
- Institutions: Institution of Civil Engineers (president)

Harry Edward Jones (1843 – 24 March 1925) was a British civil engineer.

Jones was born the son of gasworks engineer Robert Jones in Chester in 1843 and educated at the City of London School and Stepney Grammar School.

In 1859 he was apprenticed to Joseph Hamilton Beattie, the locomotive engineer of the London and South Western Railway, and in 1862 obtained a position at the Harlow Gas Works, Essex. From 1863 to 1869 he was engineer to the Wandsworth Gas Company and then became chief engineer to the Ratcliff Gas Light Company. In 1875, he was joint engineer with his father at the Commercial Gas Co, becoming Chief Engineer in 1880 when his father retired and a Director of the company in 1902. He also acted as a consulting engineer both at home and abroad.

He was awarded the Telford Medal of the Institution of Civil Engineers in 1875 for his paper on The Construction of Gasworks. He also received their Watt Medal and George Stephenson Medal.

He served as president of the Institution of Civil Engineers from November 1917 to November 1918. In this capacity, he proposed that senior, experienced civil engineers should be brought in at early stages of discussion regarding high value government engineering projects and that their involvement should extend beyond their usual technical role to that of finance and management. David Lloyd George, then prime minister, agreed to consider this but no further action was taken. Jones died in 1925.

== Footnotes ==
Professional and academic associations
Preceded by Maurice Fitzmaurice	President of the Institution of Civil Engineers; November 1917 – November 1918	Succeeded by John Aspinall
