= Callcott Reilly =

British engineer (1828–1900)

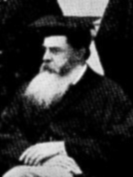
- Born: 28 October 1828; Sheffield, West Riding of Yorkshire, England
- Died: 21 May 1900 (aged 71); Clergy House, Englefield Green, Egham, Surrey
- Spouse(s): Emma Birch (1852), Barbara Brant (1895)
- Children: Charles, Frederick, Philip, Frances, Walter
- Parent(s): James Riley and Sarah Callcott
- Engineering career
- Discipline: Civil engineering
- Institutions: Institution of Civil Engineers
- Significant advance: Uniform Stress in Girder Work
- Awards: Telford Medal

Callcott Reilly (28 October 1828 – 21 May 1900) was a British civil and construction engineer. He is noted for his work on uniform stress, as illustrated by reference to bridge building, for which the Institution of Civil Engineers awarded him the Telford Medal in 1865. He played a prominent role in promoting the professional education of engineers and in 1871 became the first Professor of Engineering Construction at the newly formed Royal Indian Engineering College (RIEC) located at Coopers Hill near Englefield Green.
