= Harley Dalrymple-Hay =

British civil engineer

- Born: 6 October 1861; Bengal Presidency, British India
- Died: 17 December 1940; Chorleywood, Hertfordshire, England
- Known for: Underground railway systems

Sir Harley Hugh Dalrymple-Hay (1861–1940) was an engineer working on underground railways in and around London, England. He was awarded the Telford Medal in gold by the Institution of Civil Engineers for his paper on the Waterloo and City Railway.

== Life and career ==
Harley Dalrymple-Hay was educated privately in Edinburgh and was articled as pupil to the Chief Engineer of the Midland Railway, working on the lines being built by that company in South Wales. From there he moved on to the drawing office of the London & South Western Railway. In 1894 he was appointed resident engineer on the Waterloo & City Railway, and after this he continued to work on various underground railway lines. He worked on the Bakerloo line, the Hampstead tube and the Piccadilly line, and was consulting engineer to the London Post Office Railway which was completed in 1928.

After World War I he was involved in an extensive programme of station reconstruction on the London Underground system, including the replacement of many lifts with escalators. One of his protegees was Harold Harding who described their working conditions in his autobiography. He died in 1940.
