= Telford Medal =

British civil engineering prize

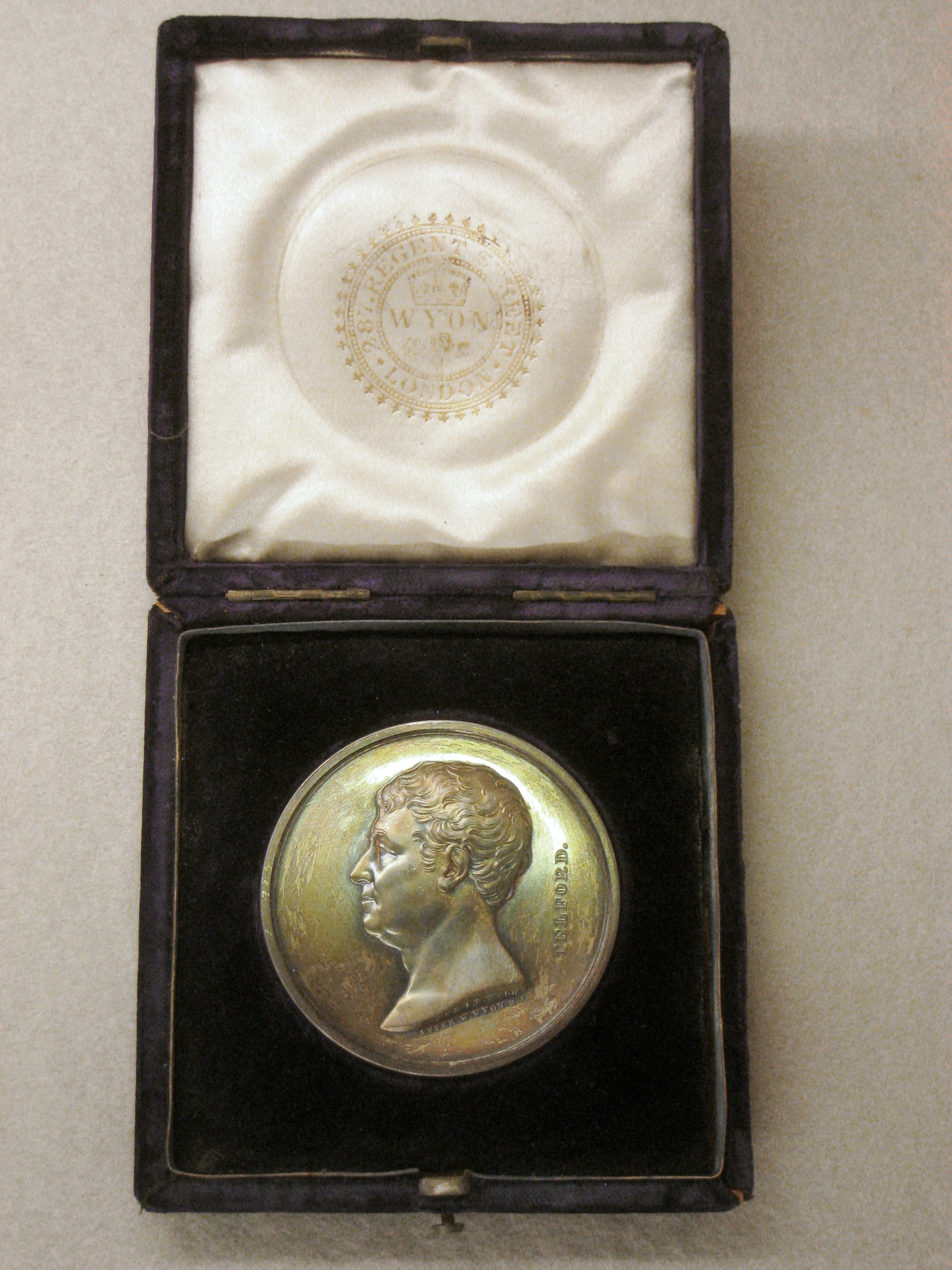
Telford Medal, in Lake Biwa Canal Museum of Kyoto, Japan

The Telford Medal is a prize awarded by the British Institution of Civil Engineers (ICE) for a paper or series of papers. It was introduced in 1835 following a bequest made by Thomas Telford, the ICE's first president. It can be awarded in gold, silver or bronze; the Telford Gold Medal is the highest award the institution can bestow.

== History ==
In 1834 Scottish civil engineer and the Institution of Civil Engineers' first president (1820–1834), Thomas Telford died, leaving in his will his library of technical works to the Institution of Civil Engineers, as well as a bequest of £2000; the interest from which was to be used to for the purpose of "Annual Premiums". The council of the institute decided to expend the premiums on both honorary and monetary rewards, the honorary awards being named Telford Medals, which would be awarded in gold, silver and bronze forms. Suitable candidates for the awards were submitters of drawings, models, diagrams or essays relating to civil engineering or any other new equipment of invention relating to engineering or surveying in general, which is regarded as most seminal and influential. The awards were to be open to both Englishmen and foreigners equally. After provision for the Telford Medal, the remaining income is used for up to four annual prizes for papers presented to the institution.

The inaugural gold award was given in June 1837 to John Timperley for his account of the history and construction of the town docks of the Port of Kingston upon Hull, published in volume 1 of the Transactions of the Institution of Civil Engineers; the medals carried an image of Telford on one side, and of his Menai Bridge on the reverse. The bust of Telford was a design by William Wyon and the medal is also signed "J. S. and A. B. Wyon" a collaboration of Joseph Shepherd Wyon and his brother, Alfred Benjamin Wyon. John Macneill, James M. Rendel, Michael A. Borthwick, Peter Barlow, and Benedetto Albano received silver awards in the same session.

== Recipients ==
=== Telford Medal ===
The Telford gold medal is issued generally once a year. See below for the Telford Premium of which a larger number (up to 10, may be issued each year in the silver and bronze categories).

==== 21st century ====
Gold Silver Bronze

Year	Name	Medal	Paper
2024	B. Cerfontaine, M.J. Brown, J.A. Knappett, C. Davidson, Y.U. Sharif, M. Huisman, M. Ottolini, J.D. Ball		Control of screw pile installation to optimise performance for offshore energy applications
2023	S. Nagula, M. Nguyen, J. Grabe, J. Kardel, T. Bahl		Field measurements and numerical analysis of vibroflotation of sand
2022	S. Kaminski, R. Henly, N. Ciuffetelli and others		Strengthening the 1960s UK Commonwealth Institute hyperbolic paraboloid roof
2021	Z. Zhou, C.D. O'Loughlin, D.J. White		An effective stress analysis for predicting the evolution of SCR–seabed stiffness accounting for consolidation
2020	M.S.P. Wan, J.R. Standing, D.M. Potts, J.B. Burland		Pore water pressure and total horizontal stress response to EPBM tunnelling in London Clay
2019	N.M. Pinyol, M Alvarado, E.E. Alonso, F. Zabala		Thermal effects in landslide mobility
2018	M.S.P. Wan, J.R. Standing, D.M. Potts, J.B. Burland		Measured short-term subsurface ground displacements from EPBM tunnelling in London Clay
2017	Rainer Barthel, Joram Tutsch, Joseph Jordan		The Gothic tower of Freiburg Minster, Germany: analysis and repair
2016	Alba Yerro, Eduardo E. Alonso, Nuria M. Pinyol		The material point method for unsaturated soils
2014	R. Kerry Rowe		Performance of GCLS in liners for landfill and mining applications
2013	Brian A. Giannakopoulos, Nigel B. Kaye and Gary R. Hunt		The influence of room geometry on the overturning of smoke owing to a floor fire
2012	Deric J. Oehlers, M.S. Mohamed Ali, Michael C. Griffith, Matthew Haskett, Wade Lucas		A generic unified reinforced concrete model
2011	Victoria B. Ashley, John E. Earp, David J. Coates, Roger Ashworth		The accelerator-driven thorium reactor power station
2010	Santiago Huerta		The safety of masonry buttresses
2009	Neil Hoult, Paul Fidler, Campbell Middleton, Kenichi Soga		Wireless sensor networks: Creating 'smart infrastructure'
2008	Alan E. Vardy		Generation and alleviation of sonic booms from rail tunnels
2007	Michael B. Abbott		Managing the inner world of infrastructure
2006	Eduardo E. Alonso, Antonio Gens		Aznalcóllar Dam failure
2005	H. Sharman		Why wind power works for Denmark
2004	Robert H.J. Sellin, David P. van Beesten		Conveyance of a managed vegetated two-stage river channel
2003	Simon J. Wheeler, Marc S.R. Buisson, Radhey S. Sharma		Coupling of hydraulic hysteresis and stress–strain behaviour in unsaturated soils
2002	Lidija Zdravković, David M. Potts, David W. Hight		The effect of strength anisotropy on the behaviour of embankments on soft ground
2001	Melanie Batten, William Powrie		Measurement and analysis of temporary prop loads at Canary Wharf underground station, east London
2000	Scott W. Sloan		ARC Centre of Excellence in Geotechnical Science and Engineering, University of Newcastle, NSW, Australia.
2000	Hai-Sui Yu		Professor of Geotechnical Engineering and Executive Dean of the Faculty of Engineering at the University of Nottingham

==== 20th century ====
Gold Silver Bronze

Year	Name	Medal	Paper
1999	Graham W Plant and Douglas E Oakervee		Hong Kong International Airport – civil engineering design
1998	David Potts, Peter Rolfe Vaughan, Nebojsa Kovacevic		Delayed collapse of cut slopes in stiff clay.
1997	Alistair Biggart		Storebaelt Tunnel
1995	R.P.J. Clarke and Colin Norman Paterson Mackenzie		Overcoming ground difficulties at Tooting Bec
1994	R.P.J. Clarke and Colin Norman Paterson MacKenzie		Overcoming Ground Difficulties at Tooting Bec.
1994	Eduardo E. Alonso, Antonio Gens, A. Lloret		The landslide of Cortes de Pallas, Spain
1993	A.R. Flint (jointly)		Strengthening and Refurbishment of The Severn Crossing
1991	David Potts, Peter Rolfe Vaughan		
1989	Nick Shirlaw		
1986	D. Droy, A. McGowan, D.C. Mann		A8 Port Glasgow Eastern Section: Design and Construction.
1985	Rodney C. Bridle, Peter Rolfe Vaughan, Howard N. Jones		Empingham Dam – Design, Construction and Performance
1984	Jayanta K. Mitra, J. H. Tetlow, and N. Ellis		Hutton Tension Leg Platform – The Hutton Tension Leg Platform
?	Terence W. Hulme		
1982	Nigel Ruffle		
1981	Roy Severn, Alan Jeary, Brian Ellis		Forced vibration testing of embankment dams using an eccentric mass exciter system
1978	David Blockley		Analysis of Structural Failures
1976	Sir Alan Muir Wood		
1973	Alistair Biggart		The Bentonite Tunnelling Machine
1973	John Vernon Bartlett		
1971	John Vernon Bartlett		
1968	Letitia Chitty		
1968	Peter Walter Rowe		Summary. The Influence of Geological Features of Clay Deposits on the Design and Performance of Sand Drains
1968	Geoffrey Binnie		
1965	Bill Carlyle		Llyn Brianne Water Scheme, River Towy, Wales
1964	Mary Kendrick		'Reasons for siltation in the Mersey estuary' First female medallist
1962	Henry Chilver, Baron Chilver		
1962	Stanley Bernard Warder		'Electric Traction in the British Railways Modernization Plan'
1958	Gerald Lacey		`regime theory' for the design of major irrigation canals and Stable Channel Flow.
1949	C.B.H.Colquhoun, Terence Patrick O'Sullivan		The Brabazon Assembly Hall at Filton
1948	Alexander Mitchell		Screw-piles
1935	B. M. Hellstrom		
c.1934	J.J.C Bradfield		The Sydney Harbour Bridge and Approaches
1932	John Fleetwood Baker		Design of steel-framed buildings
1930	William Thomson Halcrow		Lochaber (water-power) scheme.
1928	Sydney Lionel Rothery		A.M.I.C.E., paper describing the salient engineering features of an international irrigation project in California, United States, and in Lower California, Mexico.
c.1928	Oscar Faber		Plastic Yield, Shrinkage, and Other Problems of Concrete, and Their Effect on Design
1927	Oswald Longstaff Prowde		The Gezira Irrigation Scheme, including the Sennar Dam on the Blue Nile
1926	John Arthur Saner		The most efficient & economical means of overcoming differences in level in canals and inland navigations
1924	Charles Inglis		The Theory of Transverse Oscillations in Girders and its Relation to Live Load and Impact Allowance
1921	Ernest George Coker		
1918	Edward Sandeman	Gold	'Derwent Valley Waterworks' (Derwent and Howden Dam construction, Peak District, UK)
1915	James R. Forgie		The Laxaxalpam Aqueduct Tunnels in Mexico
1914	John Vipond Davies		'Extensions of the Hudson River Tunnels of the Hudson and Manhattan Railroad Company'
?	William Wright Harts		
1911	Francis Collingwood		Repairs to the Allegheny Bridge
1911	William J. Wilgus		Detroit River Tunnel
1910	Adam Hunter and Francis Charles Buscarlet		Queen Alexandra Bridge over the River Wear, Sunderland.
1910	George Robert Graham Conway		Chief Engineer, Monterrey Railway, Light and Power Company, Mexico
1910	Charles Mattathias Jacobs		Tunnelling the North River
1907–1908	William Barclay Parsons		'The New York Rapid Transit Subway.'
1906–1907	Dugald Clerk		
1906–1907	Edward John Way		
1905–1906	George Alfred Denny		'Design and Working of Gold-Milling Equipment, with special reference to the Witwatersrand.'
1904–1905	Lord Brassey		'Shipbuilding for the Navy.'
1904–1905	Charles Stuart Russell Palmer		'Coolgardie Water-Supply.'
1904–1905	Major Sir Robert Hanbury Brown		
1901–1902	John McFarlane Gray		'Variable and Absolute Specific Heats of Water'
1901–1902	William Morris Mordey		′Electrical traction on Railways′ (joint paper with Bernard M. Jenkin)
1901	William T.C. Beckett		The Bridges over the Orissa Rivers on the East Coast Extension of the Bengal-Nagpur Railway.
1900	Edmund Wragge and George Andrew Hobson		The Metropolitan Terminus of the Great Central Railway
1900	Llewelyn Birchall Atkinson and Claude William Atkinson (brothers)		'Electrical Mining Machines'

==== 19th century ====
Gold Silver Bronze

Year	Name	Medal	Paper
1897–1898	Arthur Henry Preece		'The Electricity Supply of London'
1897–1898	Henry Charles Stanley		'Re-erection of the Albert Bridge, Brisbane'
1897–1898	Henry Fowler		'Calcium Carbide and Acetylene'
1896–1897	Herbert Alfred Humphrey		'The Mond Gas-Producer Plant and its Application.'
1896–1897	Colonel John Pennycuick		'The Diversion of the Periyar'
1896–1897	Edward Clapp Shankland		'Steel Skeleton Construction in Chicago'
1896–1897	Thomas Holgate		'The Enrichment of Coal-Gas'
1896–1897	Dugald Drummond		'Investigation into the Use of Progressive High Pressures in Non-compound Locomotive Engines'
1895–1896	Matthew Henry Phineas Riall Sankey		'The Thermal Efficiency of Steam Engines'
1895–1896	James Alfred Ewing		'The Magnetic Testing of Iron and Steel'
1895–1896	John Oliver Arnold		'The Influence of Carbon on Iron.'
1895–1896	George Henry Hill		'The Thirlmere Works for the Water-Supply of Manchester'
1894–1895	William Duff Bruce		'The Kidderpur Docks, Calcutta'
1894–1895	Sigvard Johnson Berg		'The St. Gothard Mountain Railway and the Stanzerhorn Cable Railway'
1894–1895	Archibald Sharp		'Circular Wheel Teeth'
1894–1895	Henry Gill		Posthumously for 'The Filtration of the Muggel Lake Water Supply, Berlin'
1893–1894	William John Bird Clerke		Construction of the masonry dam at Tansa
1893–1894	Sakuro Tanabe		'The Lake Biwa to Kioto Canal'
1892–1893	Peter William Willans		'Steam Engine Trials'
1892–1893	Mathew Buchan Jamieson and John Howell		'Mining and Ore-Treatment at Broken Hill, New South Wales'
1892–1893	George Shattuck Morison		'The River Piers of the Memphis Bridge'
1892–1893	Robert Gordon		'Hydraulic Work in the Irrawaddy Delta'
1892–1893	Alan Brebner		'Relative Powers of Lighthouse Lenses'
1892–1893	Alexander Pelham Trotter		The Distribution and Measurement of Illumination
1891–1892	Francis Fox		'The Hawarden Bridge'
1891–1892	Alfred Weeks Szlumper		"Widening and Improvement Works London and South Western Railway Metropolitan Extension".
1891–1892	Thomas Hudson Beare		"The Building-Stones of Great Britain: their Crushing Strength and other Properties".
1890–1891	Rookes Evelyn Bell Crompton		
1889–1890	John Robinson		'The Barry Dock Works including the Hydraulic Machinery and the Mode of Tipping Coal'
1889–1890	Charles Ormsby Burge		
1889–1890	Frederick Thomas Granville Walton		Chief Engineer of Dufferin Bridge, India, 1887
1888–1889	Gisbert Kapp		'Alternate Current Machinery'
1888–1889	Edgar Worthington		
1887–1888	Robert Abbott Hadfield		'Manganese in its Application to Metallurgy and Some Newly discovered Properties of Iron and Manganese'
1887–1888	Edward Hopkinson		'Electrical Tramway: the Bessbrook and Newry Tramway'
1887–1888	Josiah Pierce Jun		'The Economic Use of the Plane-Table in Topographical Surveying'
1885–1886	Gisbert Kapp		'Modern Continuous Current Dynamo-Electric Machines and their Engines'
1885–1886	Charles Edmund Stromeyer		'The Injurious Effect of a Blue Heat on Steel and Iron'
1885–1886	Leveson Francis Vernon-Harcourt		'The River Seine'
1883–1884	Thomas Andrews		'Galvanic Action between Wrought Iron, Cast Metals, and various Steels, during long exposure in Sea-water'
1883–1884	George Howard Darwin		
1883–1884	Sir Samuel Bagster Boulton, Bt		'The Antiseptic Treatment of Timber'
1883–1884	William Foster		'Experiments on the Composition and Destructive Distillation of Coal'
1883–1884	Francis Collingwood		'On Repairing the Cables of the Allegheny Suspension Bridge at Pittsburgh, Pa., U.S.A'
1882–1883	Ralph Hart Tweddell		'On Machine-Tools, and other Labour-saving Appliances, worked by Hydraulic-Pressure,'
1882–1883	William Anderson		'Antwerp Waterworks'
1882–1883	George Howard		
1881-1882	Theophilus Seyrig		
1881-1882	Max an Ende		
1881-1882	James Weyrauch		
1880–1881	Benjamin Walker		'Machinery for Steel Making by Bessemer and Siemens Processes.'
1879–1880	James Bower Mackenzie		'The Avonmouth Dock.'
1879–1880	Adam Fettiplace Blandy		'Dock Gates'
1879–1880	Joseph Lucas		Hydrogeological surveys
1877–1878	Frederick Augustus Abel		
1876–1877	Benjamin Baker		Cleopatra's Needle
1874–1875	George Deacon		'On the Constant and Intermittent Supply of Water'
1874–1875	William Hackney		'The Manufacture of Steel'
1874–1875	Harry Edward Jones		'The Construction of Gasworks'
1874–1875	Alexander Richardson Binnie		'The Nagpur Waterworks'
1873–1874	Bindon Blood Stoney		'On the construction of Harbour and Marine Works'
1873–1874	Richard Christopher Rapier		'On the Fixed Signals of Railways'
1873–1874	Joseph Prestwich		'On the Geological Conditions affecting the Construction of a Tunnel between England and France'
1872–1873	Bradford Leslie		'Account of the Bridge over the Gorai River, on the Goalundo Extension of the Eastern Bengal Railway'
1872–1873	Carl Wilhelm Siemens		'Pneumatic Despatch Tubes'
1872–1873	William Bell		'On the Stresses of Rigid Arches, Continuous Beams and Curved Structures'
1872–1873	John Herbert Latham		'The Soonkesala Canal of the Madras Irrigation and Canal Company'
1872–1873	George Gordon		'The Value of Water and its Storage and Distribution in Southern India'
1870–1871	Edward Dobson		'Memoir on the Public Works of the Province of Canterbury, New Zealand'
1870–1871	Thomas Sopwith		'The Dressing of Lead Ores'
1870–1871	James Nicholas Douglass		'The Wolf Rock Lighthouse'
1870–1871	Bernhard Samuelson		'On the Construction of Blast Furnaces'
1869–1870	Jules Gaudard		'On the Present State of Knowledge as to the Strength and Resistance of Materials'
1869–1870	William Shelford		'On the Outfall of the River Humber'
1869–1870	Zerah Colborne		'On American Locomotives and Rolling Stock'
1869–1870	Thomas Nesham Kirkham		'Experiments on the Standards of Comparison employed for Testing the Illuminating Power of Coal Gas'
1869–1870	John Ellacott		'Description of the Low Water Basin at Birkenhead'
1869–1870	David Thomas Ansted		'On the Lagoons and Marshes of certain parts of the Shores of the Mediterranean'
1868–1869	George Higgin		'Irrigation in Spain chiefly in reference to the Construction of the Henares and Esla Canals in that Country'
1868–1869	Christer Peter Sandberg		'On the Manufacture and Wear of Rails'
1868–1869	Lieutenant Colonel Peter Pierce Lyons O'Connell		'On the Relation of the Fresh Water Floods of Rivers to the Areas and Physical Features of their Basins'
1868–1869	William Wilson		'Description of the Victoria Bridge on the line of the Victoria Station and Pimloco Railway'
1868–1869	Charles Douglas		'On New Railways at Battersea; with the Widening of the Victoria Bridge and Approaches to the Victoria Station'
1868–1869	John Wolfe Barry		'On the City Terminus Extension of the Charing Cross Railway'
1866–1867	James Timmins Chance		'On Optical Apparatus used in Lighthouses'
1866–1867	Edward Byrne		'Removal of Organic and Inorganic Substances in Water'
1866–1867	George Biddell Airy Astronomer Royal		'On the use of the Suspension Bridge with Stiffened Roadway for Railway and other Bridges of Great Span'
1865–1866	Richard Price Williams		
1865–1866	Calcott Reilly		'On Uniform Stress in Girder Work, illustrated by reference to two bridges recently built'
1865–1866	Edwin Clark		The Hydraulic Lift Graving Dock
1865–1866	Robert Manning		The flow of water off the ground in the Woodburn District near Carrickfergus
1865–1866	Joseph William Bazalgette		On the Main Drainage of London, and the Interception of the Sewage from the River Thames
1864–1865	Matthew Digby Wyatt		the construction of the Exhibition building
1864–1865	Charles Tilston Bright		Submarine Telegraphy to China and Australia
1864–1865	Henry Whatley Tyler		'The Festiniog for Passengers'
1863–1864	John Brunton		'Description of the Line and Works of the Scinde Railway'
1863–1864	James Robert Mosse		'On American Timber Bridges'
1863–1864	Zerah Colburn		'On American Iron Bridges'
1863–1864	Harrison Hayter		'On the Charing Cross Bridge'
1861–1862	William Henry Preece		'On the Maintenance and Durability of Submarine Cables in Shallow Waters'
1861–1862	George Parker Bidder		'The National Defences'
1861–1862	Francis Fox		'On the Results of Trials of Varieties of Iron Permanent Way'
1859–1860	James John Berkeley		'On Indian Railways, with a description of the Great Indian Peninsular Railway'
1859–1860	Richard Boxall Grantham		On Arterial Drainage and Outfalls'
1858–1859	Robert Mallet		'on the Coefficients of Elasticity and Rupture in Wrought Iron.'
1858–1859	Sir Henry Bessemer		The Bessemer Process
1858–1859	Michael Scott		'Description of the breakwater at the Port of Blyth and of improvements in breakwaters applicable to harbours of refuge'
1858–1859	William Joseph Kingsbury		'Description of the entrance, entrance lock and jetty walls of the Victoria (London) docks'
1857–1858	James Atkinson Longridge		'On submersing telegraph cables'
1857–1858	George Robertson		'An Investigation into the Theory and Practice of Hydraulic Mortar'
1857–1858	James Henderson		'on the Methods generally employed in Cornwall in dressing Tin and Copper Ores'
1857–1858	Robert Jacomb-Hood		'On the Arrangement and Construction of Railway Stations'
1857–1858	Major-General George Borlase Tremenheere		'On public works in the Bengal Presidency'
1857–1858	Alfred Giles		'On the Construction of the Southampton Docks'
1856–1857	Daniel Kinnear Clark		'On the Improvement of Railway Locomotive Stock'
1856–1857	Robert Hunt		'On Electro-Magnetism as a Motive Power'
1856–1857	George Rennie		'On the Employment of Rubble Beton, or Concrete, in Works of Engineering or Architecture'
1856–1857	William Bridges Adams		'On the Varieties of Permanent Way, practically used, or tried, on Railways'
1855–1856	John Murray		'On the Progressive Construction of the Sunderland Docks'
1855–1856	John Mortimer Heppel		'On the relative proportions of the Top, Bottom, and Middle Webs of Iron Girders and Tubes'
1855–1856	Henry Robinson		'On the Past and Present Condition of the River Thames'
1855–1856	Charles Robert Drysdale		'On Steep Gradients of Railways and the Locomotives employed'
1855–1856	Frederick M. Kelly		'On the Junction of the Atlantic and Pacific Oceans and the practicability of a Ship Canal without Locks, by the Valley of the Atrato'
1854–1855	Edward Ellis Allen		'On the Comparative Cost of Transit, by Steam and Sailing Colliers, and on the Different Modes of Ballasting'
1854–1855	James Barton		'On the Economic Distribution of Material in the Sides, or Vertical Portion of Wrought-Iron Beams'
1854–1855	Richard Alexander Robinson		'On the Application of the Screw Propeller, to the Larger Class of Sailing Vessels'
1854–1855	Joseph Phillips		'Description of the Iron Roof, in one Span, over the Joint Railway Station, New Street, Birmingham'
1853–1854	Nathaniel Beardmore		'Description of the Navigation and Drainage Works, recently executed on the Tidal portion of the River Lea'
1853–1854	Andrew Henderson		'On the Speed and other properties of Ocean Steamers and on the measurement of Ships for Tonnage'
1853–1854	John Pigott Smith		'On Macadamised Roads, for the Streets of Towns'
1853–1854	Alfred Charles Hobbs		'On the Principles and Construction of Locks'
1853–1854	James Yates		'On the means of attaining to Uniformity in European Measures, Weights and Coins'
1852–1853	John Coode		'Description of the Chesil Bank'
1852–1853	Daniel Kinnear Clark		'Experimental Investigation of the Principles of the Boilers of Locomotive Engines'
1852–1853	William Alexander Brooks		'On the Improvement of Tidal Navigation and Drainages'
1852–1853	John Barker Huntington		'Observations on Salt Water, and its application to the Generation of Steam'
1852–1853	Harry Potter Burt		'On the Nature and Properties of Timber, with notices of several methods now in use for its preservation from Decay'
1852–1853	Thomas Duncan		'Description of the Liverpool Corporation Water Works'
1852–1853	Charles William Siemens		'On the Conversion of Heat into Mechanical Effect'
1852–1853	Benjamin Cheverton		'On the use of Heated Air as a Motive Power'
1852–1853	James Barrett		'On the Construction of Fire Proof Buildings'
1851–1852	Captain Mark Huish		'On Railway Accidents'
1851–1852	Braithwaite Poole		'On the Economy of Railways '
1851–1852	Colonel Samuel Colt		'On Applications of Machinery to the Manufacture of Rotating Chamber-breech Fire-arms and the peculiarities of those Arms'
1851–1852	Frederick Richard Window		'On the Electric Telegraph and the principal improvements in its construction'
1851–1852	Charles Coles Adley		'On the History, Theory and Practice of the Electric Telegraph'
1851–1852	Eugène Bourdon		'Description of the new Metallic Manometer and other instruments for measuring Pressures and Temperatures'
1851–1852	Pierre Hippolyte Boutigny (d'Évreux)		'Description of a new Diaphragm Steam Generator'
1851–1852	George Frederick White		'Observations on Artificial or Portland Cement'
1850–1851	Samuel Clegg		'On Foundations, Natural and Artificial'
1850–1851	Matthew Digby Wyatt		'On the Construction of the Building for the Exhibition of the Works of Industry of All Nations 1851'
1850–1851	Henry Swinburne		'Account of the Sea Walls at Penmaenmawr, on the line of the Chester and Holyhead Railway'
1850–1851	George Barclay Bruce		'Description of the Bridge built over the River Tweed, on the line of the York, Newcastle and Berwick Railway'
1850–1851	John Hughes		'On the Pheumatic method adopted in constructing the Foundations of the new Bridge across the Medway, at Rochester'
1850–1851	William Price Struve Hughes		'On the Ventilation of Collieries, theoretically and practically considered'
1849–1850	William George Armstrong		
1849–1850	William Henry Barlow		'On the Construction of the Permanent Way of Railways'
1849–1850	William Taylor		'On the Street Paving of the Metropolis'
1849–1850	George Benjamin Thorneycroft		'On the Manufacture of Malleable Iron and on the strength of Railway Axles'
1849–1850	Rev James Charles Clutterbuck		'On the periodical alternations and progressive permanent depression of the Chalk-water Level under London'
1849–1850	John Chubb		'On the Construction of Locks and Keys'
1849–1850	Richard Turner		'Description of the Iron Roof over the Lime Street station, Liverpool'
1849–1850	Lt Col John Augustus Lloyd		'On the facilities for the construction of a Ship Canal across the Isthmus of Panama'
1849–1850	Edward Cowper		'On Printing Machines'
1849–1850	John Patton		'Description of the Southend Pier and treatise on the habits of the Toredo navalis'
1849	John Thornhill Harrison		'Observations on the Obstructions to Navigation in Tidal Rivers'
1849	Colonel Harry David Jones		'Description and drawings of the Bridge at Athlone'
1849	Robert Benson Dockray		'Description and drawings of the Camden Station, London and North Western Railway'
1848	John Thornhill Harrison		'Observations on the Causes that are in constant operation, tending to alter the Outline of Coats, to effect the Entrances of Rivers and Harbours, and to form Shoals and Deeps in the bed of the Sea'
1848	Right Honourable the Earl of Lovelace		'On Harbours of Refuge'
1848	Alexander Mitchell		'On Submarine Foundations, particularly the Screw Pile and Mooring'
1848	Frederick Ransome		'On the production of Artificial Stone, by the combination of Silica, in a liquid form, with Sand and other materials'
1847	George Briant Wheeler Jackson		'Account of the GreatNorth Holland Canal'
1847	Joshua Richardson		'On the Ventilation of Mines'
1847	John Murray		'Account of the progressive improvements in Sunderland Harbour and the River Wear'
1847	Joseph Glynn		'Review of the plans that have been proposed for connecting the Atlantic and Pacific Oceans by a Navigable Canal'
1847	Charles Frodsham		'On the Laws of Isochronism of the Balance Spring, as connected with the higher order of adjustment of Watches and Chronometers'
1846	William Henry Barlow		'On the existence (practically) of the line of equal Horizontal Thrust in Arches'
1846	George Snell		'On the Stability of Arches'
1846	Wyndham Harding		'On the Resistance to Railway Trains at different velocities'
1846	Edward Leader Williams		'Description of the Improvements of the River Severn' The description of the award is correct but the link is to the wrong Edward L Williams; the link being to his son.
1846	William Parkes		'On the estuary of the River Severn'
1846	William West		'On Water for Locomotive Engines'
1846	Dr Louis Antoine Ritterbandt		'Description of a method of preventing the Incrustation of Steam Boilers'
1845	Philip Chilwell De La Garde		'Memoir of the Canal at Exeter from 1563 to 1724'
1845	George Edwards		'On blasting Marl Rocks under water in the River Severn'{
1844	William Fairbairn		'On the properties of Iron Ores of Samakoff, in Turkey.'
1844	John Murray		'Descriptions and drawings of the removal of the lighthouse on the north pier at Sunderland'
1844	James Bremner		'On Pulteney Town Harbour "Secret Harbour" A new Piling Engine' and 'an Apparatus for floating large stones for Harbour Works'
1844	Andrew Murray		'On the construction and proper proportions of Steam Boilers'
1844	Alexander Angus Croll		'On the purification of Coal Gas'
1844	James Braidwood		'The means of rendering large supplies of Water available in cases of Fire etc'
1844	Jacob Samuda		'Account of the Atmospheric Railway'
1844	Charles Hutton Gregory		'On Railway Cuttings and Embankments'
1844	Captain William Scarth Moorsom		'Description and drawings of the Avon Bridge at Tewkesbury'
1844	Thomas Grissell		'Description and Model of the Scaffolding used in erecting Nelson's Column'
1844	Charles Manby		'History of the Canal and Sluices at Katwyk' and 'Description and works of the Amsterdam and Rotterdam Railway'
1843	Frederick Walter Simms		On the application of horsepower to raising water etc.
1843	William Pole		'On the friction of Steam Engines etc.'
1843	Thomas Oldham		'Descriptions and drawings of the Automaton Balance invented by Mr Cotton and used at the Bank of England for weighing sovereigns'
1842	Robert Thomas Atkinson		'On the sinking and tubbing or coffering of pits, as practiced in the Coal Districts of the North of England'
1842	William Cotton		'Memoir of Captain Huddart'
1842	Chevalier Frederik Willem Conrad		'History of the Canal of Katwyk (Holland), with an account of the principal Works upon it'
1842	James John Wilkinson		'Historical Account of the various kinds of Sheathing for Vessels'
1841	John Frederick Bateman		'account of the bann reservoirs, county down, ireland'
1841	Samuel Seaward		'the action of auxiliary steam power to sailing vessels upon long voyages'
1841	Benjamin Green		'description of the arched timber viaducts on the Newcastle and North Shields Railway'
1841	Thomas Sopwith		'the construction and use of geological models in connection with civil engineering'
1841	Dr Charles Schafhaeutl		'a new universal photometer' 'on the circumstances under which the explosions of steam boilers frequently occur'
1840	James Leslie		'Account of the Works of Dundee Harbour'
1840	Robert Mallet		'On the Corrosion of Cast and Wrought Iron in Water'
1840	Charles Bourns		'On Setting-out Railway Curves'
1840	Henry Chapman		'Description and Drawings of a Machine for describing the Profile of a Road'
1840	Henry Renton		'Description and Drawing of a Self-acting Wasteboard on the River Ouse'
1839	Edward Woods		'the forms of locomotive engines'
1839	John Edward Jones		'Sewage at Westminster'
1839	Charles Hood		'Warming and ventilating buildings'
1839	Charles Wye Williams		'The properties and application of turf and turf coke'
1839	Lieutenant Frederick Pollock		'Coffer dam at Westminster Bridge'
1839	Robert William Mylne		'The well sunk by the New River Company at their reservoir at the Hampstead Road'
1839	John Baldry Redman		'Description and drawings of Bow Bridge'
1838	Isambard Kingdom Brunel		Invention of the shield at the Thames Tunnel
1838	John Pinchbeck		Drawing of the shield at the Thames Tunne
1838	Eugenius Birch		Drawing of Huddart's rope machinery
1838	George Drysdale Dempsey		Drawing of Huddart's rope machinery
1838	James Green		Canal Lifts on the Great Western Canal
1838	Francis Whishaw		'History of Westminster Bridge'
1838	Lieutenant Denison		'On the strength of American timber'
1838	Thomas Wicksteed		'on the Effective Pressure of Steam in the Cornish Condensing Engine'
1838	William Jory Henwood		'on the Expansive Action of Steam in the Cylinder of some of the Cornish Engines'
1838	Josiah Parkes		'On the Evaporation of Water from Steam Boilers'
1838	Francis Bramah		'On the strength of Cast Iron'
1838	James Meadows Rendel		Particulars of the Construction of the Floating Bridge Lately Established Across the Hamoaze, between Torpoint in the County of Cornwall and Devonport in Devonshire. (Including Plates)
1838	Stephen Ballard		'Drawing and account of the Pont-y-tu Prydd Bridge, in South Wales'
1836	John Timperley		An Account of the Harbour and Docks at Kingston-Upon-Hull. (Including Plates)
1836	James Meadows Rendel		'Particulars on the Construction of Lary Bridge, near Plymouth (Including Plate)'
1836	John Macneill		'Canal Boat experiments'
1836	Michael Andrews Borthwick		'Iron Piling'
1836	Benedetto Albano		'The stone bridge over the Dora at Turin'
1836	Peter W. Barlow		'Theoretical Investigation on the Form of Lock Gates'
1836	William Gravatt		'Improvement on the Spirit Level'

=== Undated (before 1910) recipients of Telford Medal ===
Source: Institute of Civil Engineers

- Frederick William Bidder
- Reginald Pelham Bolton
- Wifred Swanwick Boult
- John Richard Brittle
- Harley Hugh Dalrymple-Hay, for paper on the Waterloo & City tube
- George Deuchars
- William Tregarthen Douglass
- Frederick Eliot Duckham
- Maurice Fitzmaurice, for paper on the Blackwall Tunnel, 1897
- Sir Douglas Fox
- Sir Charles Augustus Hartley
- David Hay, for paper on the Blackwall Tunnel, 1897
- Bertram Hopkinson
- Bernard Maxwell Jenkin
- Harry Edward Jones
- Sidney Richard Lowcock
- John Bower Mackenzie
- James Tayler Milton
- Richard Clerk Parsons
- John James Webster
- William Willcocks
- William Henry Wheeler (1832–1915)
- John Head (1832–1881)
- Thomas T. Barton
- David William Brunton

=== Telford Premium ===
Telford Premiums are issued initially as a monetary or book award with multiple awards in most years, some of the awards also going to Medal winners.

- 1897 Colonel John Pennycuick "The Diversion of the Periyar."
- 1897 Edward Clapp Shankland "Steel Skeleton Construction in Chicago."
- 1897 Thomas Holgate "The Enrichment of Coal-Gas."
- 1897 Dugald Drummond "Investigation into the Use of Progressive High Pressures in Non-compound Locomotive Engines."
- Alexander Pelham Trotter "The Distribution and Measurement of Illumination"
- 1913 – 1914 William Willox M.A.
- 1921 Percy Allen – Port improvements at Newcastle, New South Wales
- 1926 Joseph Newell Reeson "The Influence of Electric Welding in the Design and Fabrication of Plant and Structures."
- 1950 – 1951 Frederick William Sully M.I.C.E.
- 1955 Terence Patrick O'Sullivan "The Strengthening of Steel Structures Under Load"

== See also ==
- List of engineering awards
