= John Edward Jones (sculptor) =

Irish sculptor

- Born: 2 May 1806; Dublin, Ireland
- Died: 25 July 1862 (aged 56); Finglas, Dublin, Ireland
- Known for: Sculpture

John Edward Jones (2 May 1806 – 25 July 1862) was a noted Irish civil engineer and sculptor, active in Dublin and London.

== Biography ==
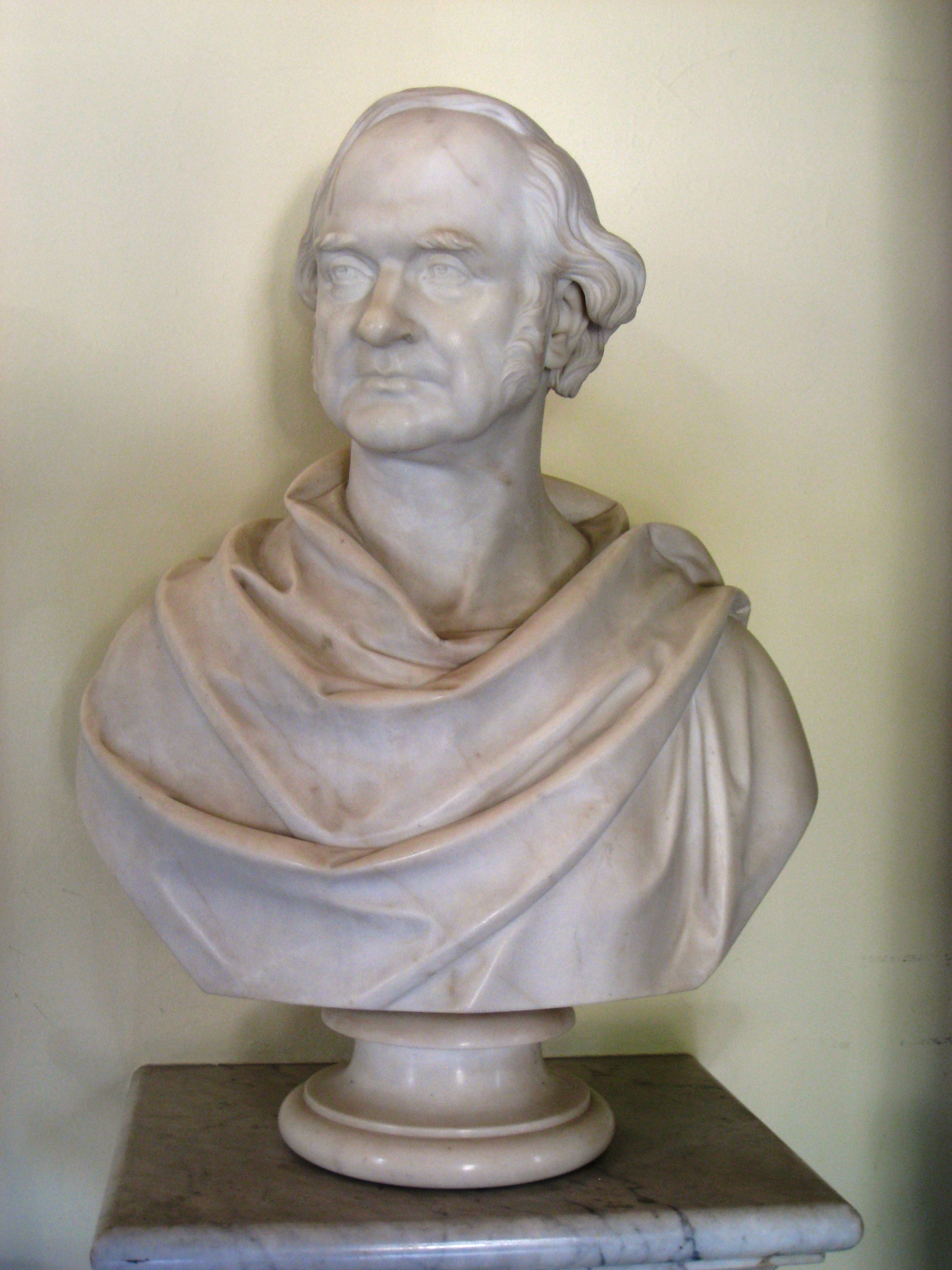
Bust of George Peabody by John Edward Jones

Jones was born in Dublin on 2 May 1806, the son of miniature painter Edward Jone s(c.1775–1862) of Chatham Street. No records of his mother survive. His father exhibited regularly in Dublin, and was secretary of the Hibernian Society of Artists.

As 'J. Jones', architect, 7 Amiens Street, North Strand, Dublin, he exhibited several watercolors at the Royal Hibernian Academy in 1828 and 1829, including his View of the Town of Youghall, showing the proposed Chain Bridge (1828) and Design for a Viaduct (1829). He studied engineering under Alexander Nimmo, and for him worked on major engineering projects in Ireland including the building of the bridge at Waterford from 1829 to 1832 (which he directed). He was listed as a civil engineer in Wilson's Dublin Directory for the years 1833 to 1835 with an office address at the Commercial Buildings, Dame Street. In 1839 he was awarded a Telford Medal in silver and 20 guineas for his paper and drawings on the sewage in Westminster.

In 1840 Jones ceased his engineering practice to become a sculptor in London, with considerable success, particularly in portrait busts of notables including Queen Victoria and Albert, Prince Consort, Napoleon III, Louis-Philippe, King of Holland and the Duke of Wellington. He exhibited at the Royal Academy from 1854 to 1862, showing over 100 works. Other sitters for Jones included Thomas Deane, George Petrie, and his friend, William Dargan. His statue of Sir Robert Alexander Ferguson for the city of Derry is his only full-length statue.

Jones died on 25 July 1862 while visiting Finglas, near Dublin, and is buried in Mount Jerome Cemetery. In his obituary in The Art Journal he was remembered as "‘a kind, courteous and generous disposition" and "in wit, humour, and vivacity, he was a thorough Irishman".
