= William Beckett (engineer) =

British soldier and railway engineer (1862–1956)

Brigadier-General William Ceckett CBE DSO VD
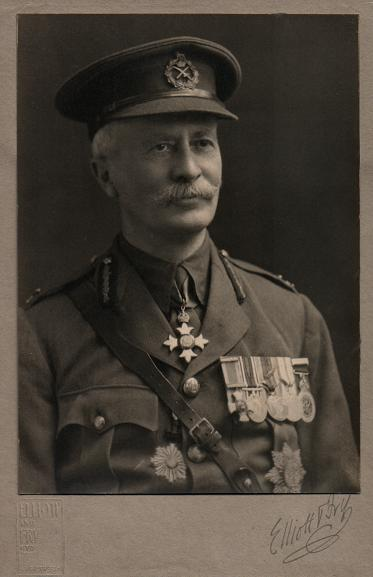
- Born: William Thomas Clifford Beckett; 1862
- Died: 4 March 1956 (aged 93–94)

Brigadier-General William Thomas Clifford Beckett CBE DSO VD (1862 – 4 March 1956) was a British railway engineer in India and a British Army officer.

Beckett was the eldest son of William Henry Beckett, a colonel in the Indian Army and his wife Sarah Philadelphia Beckett (née Walton). He was educated at Tonbridge School (1877–1880, as a day-boy) and Crystal Palace School of Engineering. His uncle, Frederick Thomas Granville Walton, was an acclaimed bridge engineer in India, who was in charge of the construction of the Dufferin Bridge over the Ganges at Benares between 1881 and 1887, and who served from 1900 as the engineer-in-chief for the construction of the iconic Havelock Bridge, a 2700-metre crossing of the Godavari River in Andhra Pradesh.

In 1887, Beckett was appointed a district engineer with the Bengal-Nagpur Railway in India. He became an associate member of the Institution of Civil Engineers in 1889 and a member in 1895. He was promoted to superintending engineer in 1900 and chief engineer and acting general manager in 1901. He was particularly noted for his bridging of the rivers in Orissa, for which he was awarded the Stephenson Gold Medal and the Telford Premium. The largest and most challenging bridge completed as part of these works was the construction of the first rail bridge over the Mahanadi River at Cuttack, which was completed in 1900. From 1900 to 1904 he was government representative on both the Calcutta Port Trust and the Calcutta Corporation.

For many years, Beckett was an officer in the Bengal-Nagpur Railway Rifles, reaching the rank of lieutenant-colonel commanding the battalion. On the outbreak of the First World War in 1914 he joined the British Army and in 1915 was given command of the 1st/12th Battalion, Loyal North Lancashire Regiment, a pioneer battalion which he commanded for the rest of the war, being awarded the Distinguished Service Order (DSO) in 1918.

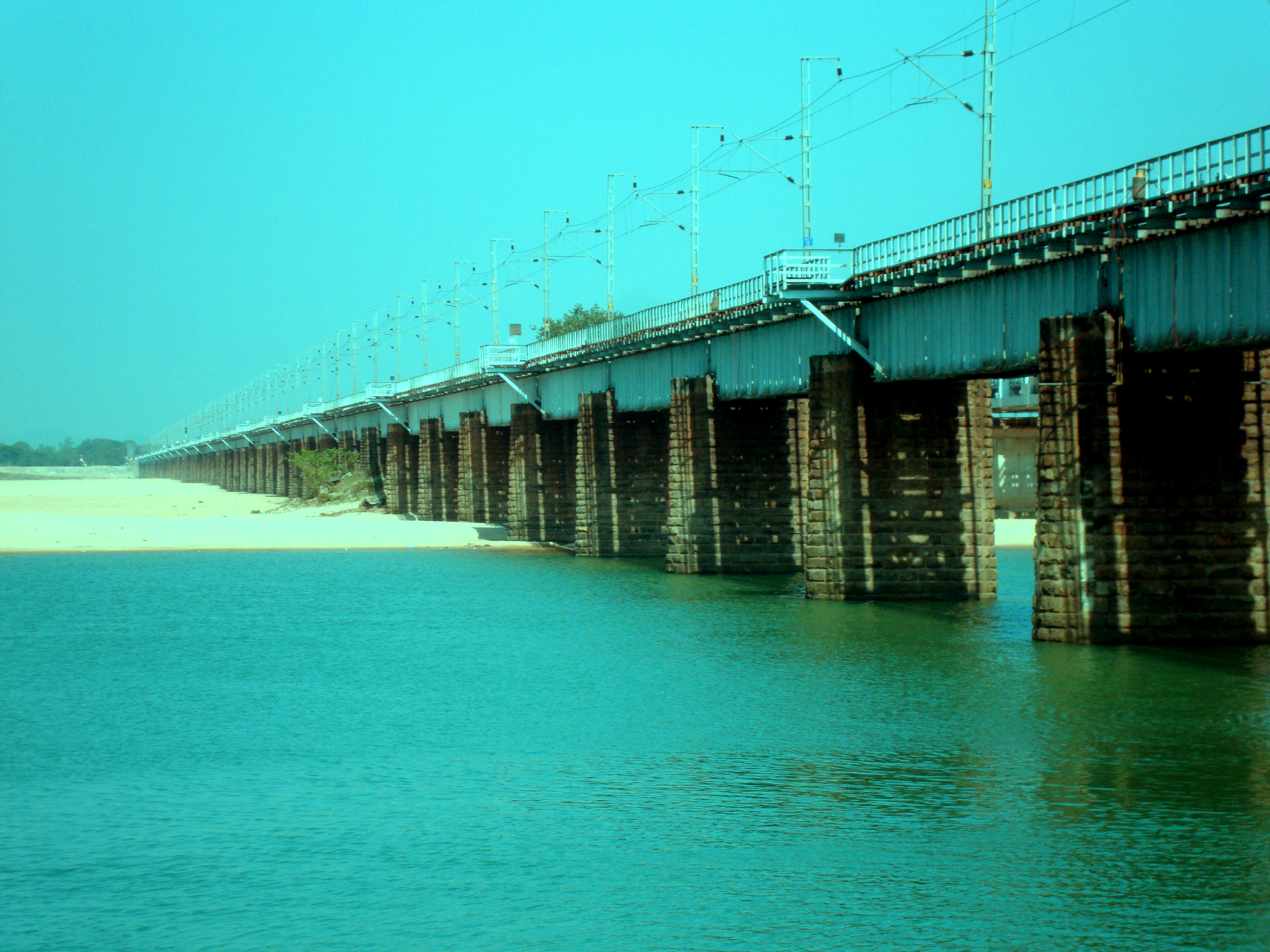
First Mahanadi Rail Bridge near Cuttack (1900)

In 1919 he was given command of the British Military Railway Mission in Siberia and Manchuria during the Russian Civil War and was later given the rank of brigadier-general. He was mentioned in dispatches four times and appointed Commander of the Order of the British Empire (CBE) in the Siberian War Honours of January 1920. From 1921 to 1923, when he retired, he was British member of the Inter-Allied Technical Board for the Trans-Siberian Railway at Harbin. He was awarded the Chinese Order of Chia Ho and the Japanese Order of the Rising Sun.

In December 1889 William Beckett married Bessie Drummond Thomason, fourth daughter of Major-General Charles Simeon Thomason and granddaughter of James Thomason, lieutenant-governor of the North-West Provinces from 1843 to 1853 and founder of the College of Civil Engineering at Roorkee. Major-General Clifford Thomason Beckett and Captain W. N. T. Beckett RN were his sons.
