= Clifford Thomason Beckett =

British Army officer

Major-General Clifford Thomason Beckett CB CBE MC
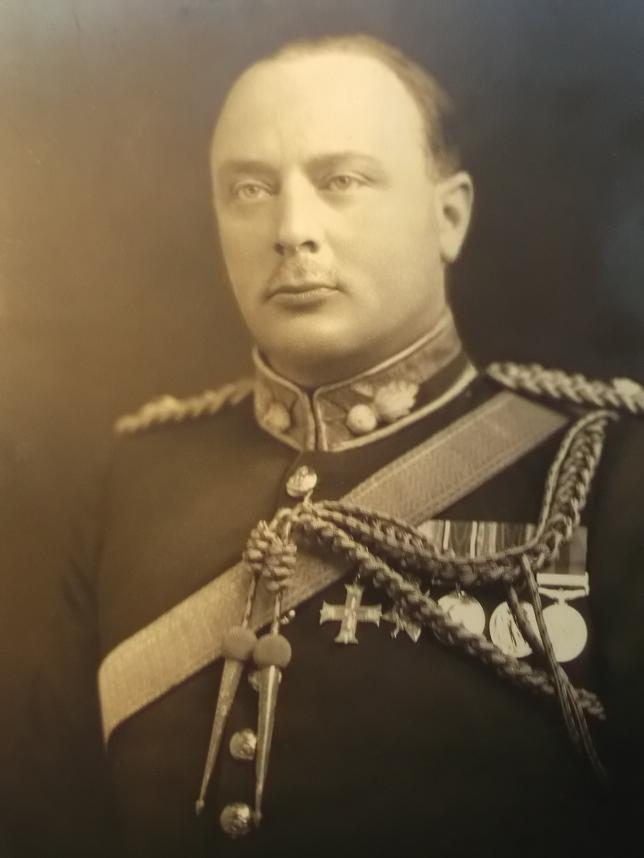
- Beckett in 1937
- Born: 9 November 1891; Tonbridge, Kent, England
- Died: 8 July 1972 (aged 80)
- Military career
- Allegiance: United Kingdom
- Branch: British Army
- Service years: 1911–1946
- Rank: Major-General
- Service number: 10920
- Units: Royal Field Artillery; Royal Artillery
- Commands: 1st Survey Regiment, Royal Artillery (1939–40); 12th Field Regiment, Royal Artillery (1938–39)
- Conflicts: First World War; Second World War
- Awards: Companion of the Order of the Bath; Commander of the Order of the British Empire; Military Cross; Mentioned in Despatches

Major-General Clifford Thomason Beckett, CB, CBE, MC (9 November 1891 – 8 July 1972) was an officer of the British Army who had a distinguished military career that spanned almost thirty-five years, including service in the two world wars.

== Early life ==
Clifford Beckett was the older son of Brigadier-General William Thomas Clifford Beckett and Bessie Drummond Thomason, daughter of Major-General Charles Simeon Thomason of the Bengal Royal Engineers. His younger brother was Walter Napier Thomason Beckett, who later joined the Royal Navy (RN).

Before his military career, Beckett's father William had been a civil engineer of the British Raj. Clifford Beckett spent a significant part of his childhood living in India, where his father was in charge of constructing the first railway bridges over the Orissa rivers on the East Coast Extension of the Bengal – Nagpur Railway, completing the connection between the cities of Calcutta and Madras. In 1901, he was awarded the Gold Medal from the Institution of Civil Engineers for a paper he presented on his completed project. The family returned to Great Britain for the boys education, and lived near Grantown-on-Spey in Scotland.

== Military career ==
Beckett was educated at Tonbridge School in his native Kent and then attended the Royal Military Academy, Woolwich, from where he was commissioned as a second lieutenant into the Royal Field Artillery of the British Army on 20 July 1911.

During the First World War Beckett, promoted in July 1914 to lieutenant, served in various campaigns including Gallipoli, France, Salonika and finally was wounded at Palestine where he received the Military Cross (MC) for his actions. He finished the war with the rank of captain. He also served in Iraq in 1919–20 during the Arab rebellion.

On 4 December 1915, Clifford Beckett married Winifred Mary Ackerley Chichester, daughter of the late C. A. W. Chichester and bore one son and two daughters. During the period between the wars Beckett was engaged in various military duties including travel in Afghanistan and Australia. In 1929, he was Staff Captain at the War Office overseeing the Special Award War Office Committee on Awards to Inventors. Beckett was later employed on strategic reconnaissances in Western Europe and also served in Lahore where he was involved in the suppression of riots and the organization of the Military Jubilee Tattoo.

At King George VI's coronation on 12 May 1937, Beckett had the honour of serving as a Gold Staff Officer.

By the start of the Second World War, Beckett had reached the rank of Commanding Officer of the 1st Survey Regiment, Royal Artillery. In this role he saw active service during the Flanders campaign of 1939–1940, where he was Mentioned in Despatches for operations in the field.

Beckett then went on to be Commander of the Royal Artillery of the 15th Scottish Division from June 1940 until May 1941 when he was appointed Commander of the Royal Artillery at Malta. Clifford Beckett remained at the Fortress of Malta for several years and rose to the rank of Major-General of the Royal Artillery & Commander Anti-Aircraft Defences Malta. During July and August 1942, Beckett acted as General Officer Commanding Troops for Malta following the departure of Major-General Daniel Marcus William Beak, VC, DSO, MC & Bar (27 July 1891 – 3 May 1967). In recognition of his actions at Malta Beckett was made a Commander of the Order of the British Empire on 18 February 1943.

By 1943 Beckett was in command of the 4th and 5th Anti-Aircraft Groups of the Royal Artillery. In April 1945 Clifford Beckett was made a Companion of the Order of the Bath in recognition of meritorious services during his military career and he retired from military service on 24 May 1946 at the rank of major general.

== Later life ==
Beckett held many positions in civilian life following his retirement from the Military. He was Honorary Fellow and President Emeritus of the Huguenot Society of London (President 1949–1952 and subsequently a vice-president). He held the position of deputy lieutenant for Somerset (1952–1967). He served as Director of the French Hospital of La Providence and was President of the Soldiers, Sailors, Airmen and Families Association (SSAFA) of Somerset, (1949–1958). Beckett also judged at the Rhône and Delhi Horse Shows.

Beckett had a keen interest in history and published The Yeomanry of Devon (with Commander W. Benson Freeman) and was a regular contributor to military journals and the Journal of Huguenot Society of London. Beckett's wife Winifred died in 1960 and Clifford Beckett died in 1972, aged 80.

== Bibliography ==
- Smart, Nick (2005). Biographical Dictionary of British Generals of the Second World War. Barnesley: Pen & Sword. ISBN 1844150496.
