= Lime Kiln Creek, Kingston upon Hull =

River in England

Coordinates: 53.7368°N 0.3424°W

Lime Kiln Creek (or Lime Kiln Drain) was an outlet onto the Humber Estuary in Kingston upon Hull, England, thought to be a previous outlet of the River Hull onto the estuary. It was blocked off during the construction of the Albert Dock in the 1860s.

== History ==
The creek takes its name from lime kilns which once stood in its vicinity.

It is thought that the creek was once the outlet of the River Hull before its flow was redirected eastwards along the Sayer Creek in early medieval times.

The creek was the site of a goods station and Lime Kiln Creek wharf, which were used by the Hull and Selby Railway and Manchester, Sheffield and Lincolnshire Railway from the 1840s onwards.

The creek was stopped up as a result of the building of the West Dock (Albert Dock) in the 1860s. During the course of the excavations for the new dock a hoard of low value (halfpennies, less than 30% silver, copper base) coins from the reign of Edward I was found 21 feet (6.4 m) below ground, near the creek.
