= Frederick Walton (engineer) =

British railway engineer in India (1840–1925)

Frederick Thomas Granville Walton CIE, M. Inst C.E., Telford Medal, (1840-1925) was a British railway engineer in India. He specialised in bridge construction. He was commonly known by his middle name Granville, and was often referred to as Mr F.T.G. Walton. Walton was born in September 1840 in Hampton, Middlesex, England to William Walton (1795–1889) of Reading, Berkshire and Elizabeth Louisa Plunkett (1801–1866) originally of Dalston, Cumberland.

== Career ==
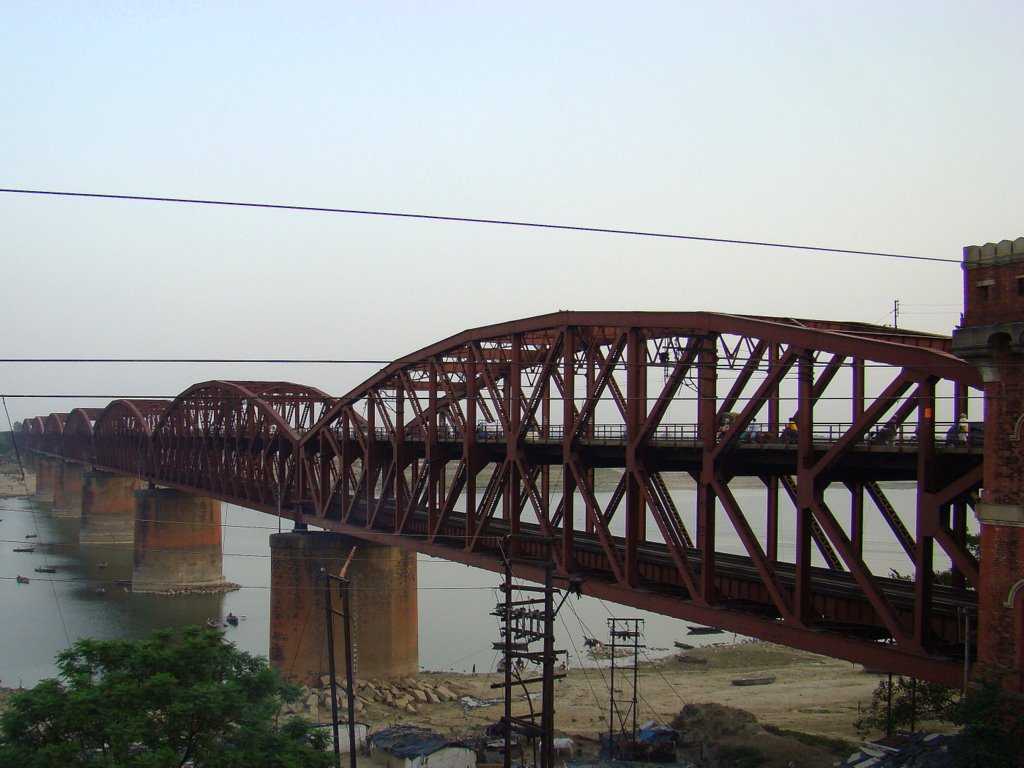
Dufferin Bridge (1887), now known as the Malviya Bridge

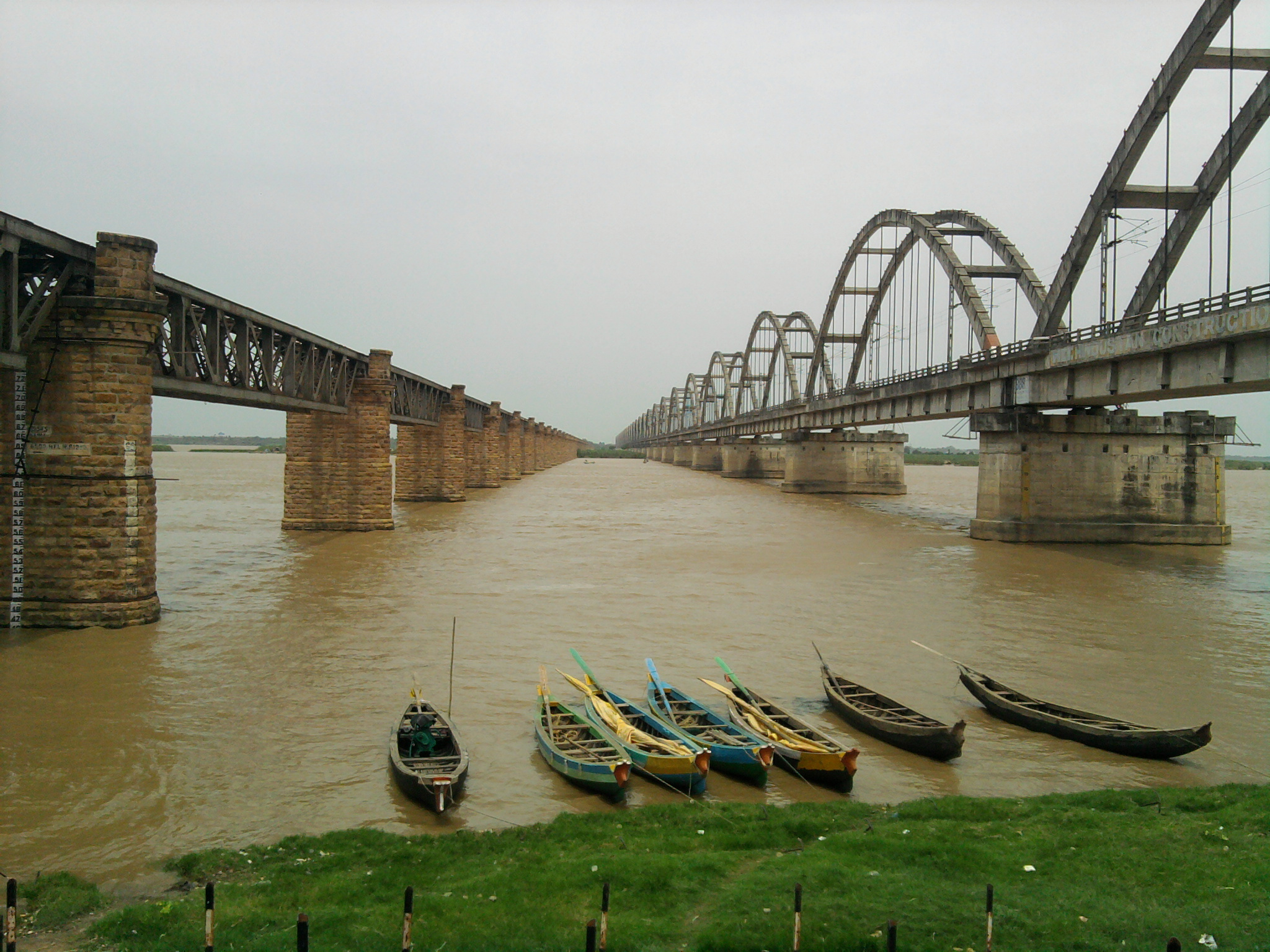
Havelock Bridge (1900) on left, now known as the Old Godavari Bridge

Walton studied under Richard Johnson, chief civil engineer of the Great Northern Railways. He worked as an assistant engineer at Cheshire Railways from 1860 to 1868. Walton then moved to India and worked for the Oudh and Rohilkhand Railway Company from 1868 to 1888. During this time he was in charge of the construction of the Ramganga River Bridge and Lines.

Between 1881 and 1887, Walton was in charge of the construction of the Dufferin Bridge over the Ganges at Benares. The bridge carries rail track on the lower deck and the Grand Trunk Road on the upper deck and is one of the major bridges over the Ganges. It has 7 spans of 350 feet (110 m) and 9 spans of 110 feet (34 m) and was the first bridge of its type constructed in the Indian sub-continent by the engineers of the Oudh and Rohilkhand Railway. The bridge is 1,048.5 metres (3,440 ft) long. It was renamed as Malviya Bridge in 1948.

In 1886, Walton was elected as a member of the Institution of Civil Engineers. Between 1889 and 1896, he was engineer-in-chief of Oudh and Rohilkhand Railway.

Between 1896 and 1900, Walton was the engineer-in-chief for the construction of the Havelock Bridge over the Godavari River, at Rajahmundry. This bridge of stone masonry piers and steel girders was one of the longest bridges in India at the time of construction. It consisted of 56 main spans of 150 feet (46 m) each and a total length of 2,950 metres (9,680 ft). In 1948, this bridge was renamed the Old Godavari Bridge.

Walton was also responsible for the construction of significant bridges at Wainganga, Bareilly, Moradabad, and Kosi Rampur.

Walton's bridge-building activities caught the attention of the author Rudyard Kipling, who it is believed used him as one of the inspirations for his character "Findlayson" in his story, The Bridge Builders. It is believed Kipling stayed with Walton during a visit to India when Walton was working on the Dufferin Bridge.

The bridge featured in The Bridge Builders is the Kashi Bridge. Kashi is another name for the city of Benares, the location of Walton's Dufferin Bridge. Just like the Kashi Bridge of the story, the Dufferin Bridge's opening ceremony was delayed due to a major flood, adding further weight to the theory that this was indeed the bridge the story was based on.

== Personal life ==
In 1877, Walton married Charlotte Eliza Roney, second daughter of Cusack Patrick Roney, author and secretary of the Eastern Counties Railway, and a director of the Grand Trunk Railway Company of Canada and the London, Chatham and Dover Railway.

They had two sons, Colonel Sir Cusack Walton DSO, RE(1878–1949) and Colonel Granville Walton O.B.E., JP, DL, RE (1888–1974), a leading member of The Boy Scouts Association.

Walton was the uncle of William Beckett, another Indian bridge and railway engineer. Beckett was greatly influenced in his career choice by his uncle, for whom he had great respect.

Walton was an inaugural member of the management committee of the British Empire Club in London alongside fellow members; The Earl of Derby (Chairman), Lord Ampthill, Lord Brassey, Lord Rothschild, Sir John Cockburn and Sir Felix Schuster.

Walton died aged 85 years old in 1925.

== See also ==
- List of longest bridges above water in India
- List of bridges in India
