= Malviya Bridge =

Malviya Bridge (Dufferin Bridge)
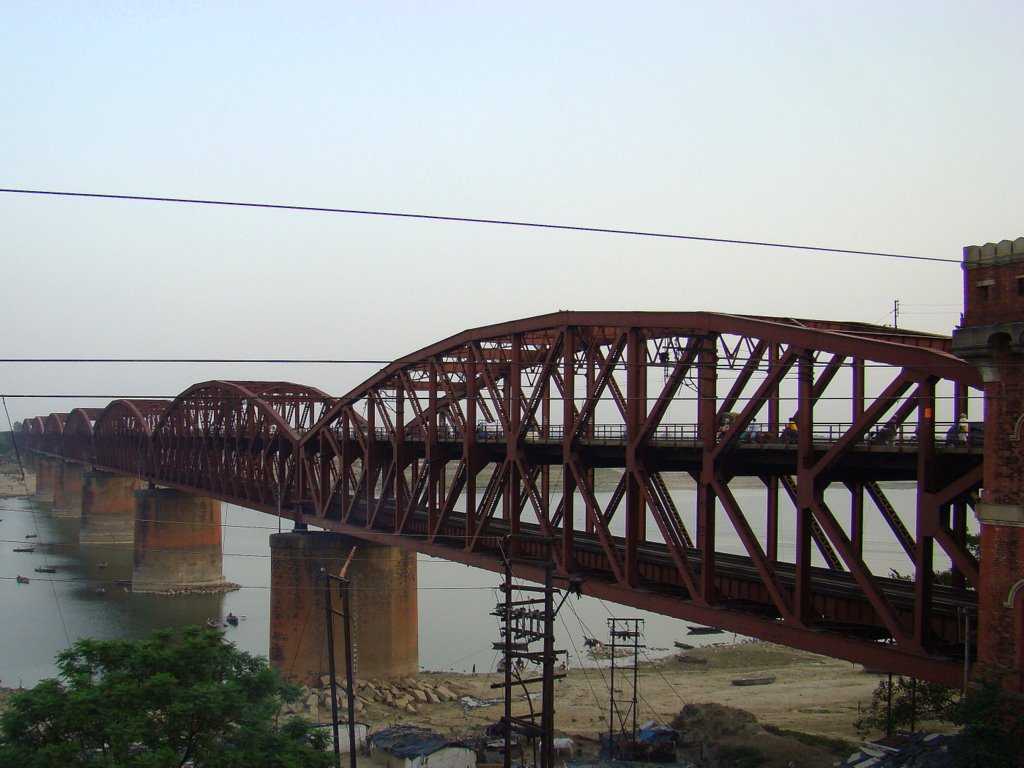
- Coordinates: 25°19′21″N 83°02′04″E
- Crosses: Ganges
- Locale: Varanasi

Characteristics
- Total length: 1048.5 metres

History
- Construction end: 1887

Malviya Bridge, inaugurated in 1887 (originally called The Dufferin Bridge), is a double decker bridge over the Ganges at Varanasi. It carries rail track on lower deck and road on the upper deck. It is one of the major bridges on the Ganges and carries the Grand Trunk Road across the river.

It has 7 spans of 350 ft and 9 spans of 110 ft and it was the first bridge of its type constructed in the Indian sub-continent by the engineers of Oudh and Rohilkhand Railway (O&R Railway). The engineer in charge of construction of the Dufferin Bridge was Frederick Thomas Granville Walton, who went on to become the Engineer in Chief of the Oudh and Rohilkhand Railway company. The bridge was renamed as the Malviya Bridge in 1948 after Madan Mohan Malaviya. As the bridge is near Rajghat, it is also locally known as Rajghat bridge. Malviya Bridge is between Kashi, Varanasi Junction and Pandit Deen Dayal Upadhyaya Junction (Mughalsarai Junction) stations.

== In fiction ==
In Rudyard Kipling's story The Bridge Builders, the bridge is given the name Kashi Bridge, after the nearby city also known as Varanasi. Dufferin Bridge's opening ceremony was delayed because of floods; the Kashi bridge in the story also faces similar problems due to flooding just before it was opened to public.

== See also ==
- List of longest bridges in the world
- List of longest bridges above water in India
