= John Timperley (civil engineer) =

British civil engineer

- Born: 1796
- Died: 1856
- Occupation: Civil Engineer

John Timperley (1796-1856), was a British Civil engineer, active in dock work in the north and east of England and elsewhere - also the first recipient of the Telford Medal.

== Work ==
He was resident engineer on John Rennie's Chetney Hill, Lazarette between 1806–16 and Wellington Bridge, Leeds in 1817-19, and Junction Dock, (constr. 1826-9) one of the Hull town docks, designed by James Walker.

He was also resident engineer on the Norwich Navigation, which included construction of a new harbour at the Port of Lowestoft, and for which he gave evidence to the Royal Commission (1826).

In 1837 he became the first recipient of the Telford Medal for his account of the history and construction of the town docks of the Port of Kingston upon Hull, published in volume 1 of the Transactions of the Institution of Civil Engineers.

In 1838 he was appointed as resident engineer to the Hull and Selby Railway. and was superintendent engineer on the harbour works for the Isle of Man in 1842.

In 1844 he was also awarded a Walker premium from the Institute of Civil Engineers for his "Account of the building of the Wellington Bridge, Leeds".

== Publications ==
- Timperley, J. (1836). "An Account of the Harbour and Docks at Kingston-Upon-Hull. (Including Plates)" (PDF). ICE Transactions. 1 (1836): 1–52. doi:10.1680/itrcs.1836.24437.
- Timperley, J. (1842). "Description of the Tanks for Kyanizing the Timber for the Permanent Way of the Hull and Selby Railway". Minutes of the Proceedings of the Institution of Civil Engineers. 2 (1842): 80–81. doi:10.1680/imotp.1842.24625. , reprinted in The London journal of arts and sciences. v.21, (1843), pp.120-131
- Timperley, J. (1844), "Account of the building of the 'Wellington' Bridge, over the river Aire, at Leeds" (PDF), Minutes of Proceedings of the Institution of Civil Engineers, 3 (666): 104–115, doi:10.1680/imotp.1844.24527
